

The following is a list of gods, goddesses, deities, and many other divine, semi-divine, and important figures from classical Philippine mythology and indigenous Philippine folk religions collectively referred to as Anito, whose expansive stories span from a hundred years ago to presumably thousands of years from modern times. The list does not include creatures; for these, see list of Philippine mythological creatures.

Overview 

The mythological figures, including deities (anitos and diwatas), heroes, and other important figures, in Anitism vary among the many ethnic groups in the Philippines. Each ethnic group has their own distinct pantheon of deities. Some deities of ethnic groups have similar names or associations, but remain distinct from one another. The diversity in these important figures is exhibited in many cases, of which a prime example is the Ifugao pantheon, where in a single pantheon, deities alone are calculated to number at least 1,500. There are over a hundred distinct pantheons in the Philippines.

Some ethnic groups have pantheons ruled by a supreme deity (or deities), while others revere ancestor spirits and/or the spirits of the natural world, where there is a chief deity but consider no deity supreme among their divinities. Each ethnic group has their own general term used to refer to all deities or a sub-set of deities, of which the most widespread term among the ethnic groups in the country is anito. The term itself can be further divided into ninuno (ancestral spirits) and diwata (gods, goddesses, and deities), although in many cases, the meaning of the terms differ depending on their ethnic association.

The following figures continue to exist and prevail among the collective memory and culture of Filipinos today, especially among adherents to the native and sacred Filipino religions, despite centuries of persecution beginning with the introduction of non-native and colonial Abrahamic religions which sought to abolish all native faiths in the archipelago beginning in the late 14th century, and intensified during the middle of the 16th century to the late 20th century. This contact between native and foreign faiths later accumulated more stories, which also became part of both faiths, with some alterations. Deity, spirit, and hero figures continue to be viewed as important and existing among native faiths and the general Filipino culture. These perceptions of existence towards gods, goddesses, deities, and spirits in the sacred native Filipino religions, is the same way how Christians perceive the existence of their god they refer as God and the same way Muslims perceive the existence of their god they refer as Allah. There have been proposals to revitalize the indigenous Philippine folk religions and make them the national religion of the country during the First Philippine Republic, but the proposal did not prosper, as the focus at the time was the war against Spanish and, later, American colonizers.

Ivatan

Immortals

Supreme Being: referred to as Mayo, in one account; probably regarded as remote as fear and meticulous ritual care are often related instead towards the Añitu
Mayo: a fisherfolk hero who introduced the yuyus used to catch flying fishes called dibang, which are in turn used to catch the summertime fish arayu
The Giver: the entity who provides all things; the souls of the upper class travel to the beings's abode in heaven and become stars
Añitu: refers to the souls of the dead, place spirits, and wandering invisibles not identified nor tied down to any particular locale or thing
Añitu between Chavidug and Chavayan: place spirit Añitus who were reported to create sounds when the gorge between Chavidug and Chavayan were being created through dynamite explosions; believed to have shifted their residences after the construction of the passage
Rirryaw Añitu: place spirit Añitus who played music and sang inside a cave in Sabtang, while lighting up fire; believed to have change residences after they were disturbed by a man
ji Rahet Añitu: a grinning place spirit Añitu who lived in an old tree; a man later cut the tree and found an earthen pot believed to have been owned by the Añitu
Nuvwan Añitu: good place spirit Añitus who saved a woman from a falling tree; they are offered rituals through the vivyayin
ji P'Supwan Añitu: good place spirit Añitus who became friends and allies of a mortal woman named Carmen Acido; sometimes taking in the form of dogs, they aided her and guided her in many of her tasks until her death from old age; despite their kindness towards Carmen, most people avoided the farm where they live
Mayavusay Añitu: place spirit Añitus living in a parcel of land in Mayavusay; sometimes take in the form of piglets, and can return cut vegetation parts into the mother vegetation
Cairn-dwelling Añitu: place spirit Añitus who lived in cairns and put a curse towards a man who destroyed their home; appearing as humans, the shaman Balaw conversed with them to right the wrong made by the man against their home
Mayuray Añitu: a wandering Añitu who expanded and was filled with darkness; encountered by a young boy who the spirit did not harm; referred as a kapri, Añitus who walk around and grow as tall as the height for their surroundings
Dayanak Añitu: a type of very small Añitu with red eyes and gold ornaments; accepting their gold ornaments will cause misfortune

Mortals

Benita: a mortal woman who was visited by her deceased husband in the form of an Añitu, which led to the return of three parcels of land to their rightful owner; in another story, she was visited by her deceased goddaughter, which led to proper rituals which appeased her goddaughter's soul
Maria: a mortal woman who was visited by the silent Añitu of her husband's relative; the spirit was later appeased through prayers
Juanito: a mortal man who was visited in a dream by his deceased father's Añitu, which led to him relenting to give more share of the family inheritance to his half-sister, Maring
Wife of Leoncio Cabading: visited by her deceased husband's Añitu, who told her to stop the prayers for it will do nothing as he was killed by a violent landslide; the spirit offered her to join him, to which she rejected
Carmen Acido: a mortal woman who became friends and allies of the Añitu from ji P'Supwan; she lived to over 80 years old
Balaw: a medicine man and shaman who communicated and controlled certain Añitus
Maria Barios: a woman whose back-basket was ridden by a wandering Añitu, who she carried until she arrived at the town center
Juan Galarion: a man who saw a giant wandering Añitu, as large as the church of Mahataw; he believed it was a kapri
Tita: a girl who was kidnapped and later returned by wandering Añitus; while being carried by the Añitus, she menstruated, which made the Añitus flee; the site where she landed is known as Ranum ñi Tita

Isneg

Immortals

Chief Spirits: may take the form of human beings, former mortals who mix with the living, and reside in bathing places
Anlabban: looks after the general welfare of the people; special protector of hunters
Bago: the spirit of the forest
Sirinan: the spirit of the river
Landusan: responsible for some cases of extreme poverty; like all evil spirits, Landusan can also be countered by the rare tagarut herb-amulet
Helpful Harvest Spirits
Abad
Aglalannawan
Anat
Binusilan
Dawiliyan
Dekat
Dumingiw
Imbanon
Gimbanonan
Ginalinan
Sibo
llanit: a group of sky dwellers
Spirits Who Harm the Harvest
Alupundan: causes the reapers’ toes to get sore all over and swell
Arurin: deity who sees to it that the harvest is bad if farmers fail to offer to her a share of the harvest
Dagdagamiyan: a female spirit who causes sickness in children for playing in places where the harvest is being done
Darupaypay: devours the palay stored in the hut before it is transferred to the granary
Ginuudan: comes to measure the containers of palay, and causes it to dwindle
Sildado: resembles a horse, and kills children who play noisily outside the house
Inargay: kills people during harvest time; the inapugan ritual of offered to the deity to appease him not to kill anyone
Alipugpug: spirit of the little whirlwind from the burned field, who portends a good harvest
Pilay: spirit of the rice, who resides on the paga, a shelf above the hearth; the pisi ritual is offered to the deity to ensure that children won't get hungry
Unnamed Man: held the world on his hands; produced a spark using a flint and a steel, causing Sal-it (lightning); in contrast, Addug (thunder) is the water roaring in the sky

Mortals

Man Who Caused Birds to Attack: a man who was aided by birds, by giving him seeds that he was tasked to plant and share with other birds; reneged on his promise, resulting to the never-ending attacks of birds on the seeds planted by mankind
Man Who Hates Flies: a man whose cow was killed by a fly, which resulted into a law that allowed the killing of flies

Tinguian (Itneg)

Immortals

Bagatulayan: the supreme deity who directs the activities of the world, including the celestial realms referred also as the Great Anito
Gomayen: mother of Mabaca, Binongan, and Adasin
Mabaca: one of the three founders of the Tinguian's three ancient clans; daughter of Gomayen and the supreme deity
Binongan: one of the three founders of the Tinguian's three ancient clans; daughter of Gomayen and the supreme deity
Adasin: one of the three founders of the Tinguian's three ancient clans; daughter of Gomayen and the supreme deity
Emlang: servant of the supreme deity
Kadaklan: deity who is second in rank; taught the people how to pray, harvest their crops, ward off evil spirits, and overcome bad omens and cure sicknesses
Apadel (Kalagang): guardian deity and dweller of the spirit-stones called pinaing
Init-init: the god of the sun married to the mortal Aponibolinayen; during the day, he leaves his house to shine light on the world
Gaygayoma: the star goddess who lowered a basket from heaven to fetch the mortal Aponitolau, who she married
Bagbagak: father of Gaygayoma
Sinang: mother of Gaygayoma
Takyayen: child of Gaygayoma and Aponitolaul popped out between Gaygayoma's last two fingers after she asked Aponitolau to prick there
Makaboteng: the god and guardian of deer and wild hogs

Mortals

Aponibolinayen: mortal spouse of the sun god, Init-init
Aponitolau: mortal who was fetched by the star goddess Gaygayoma, despite him being already married

Kalinga

Immortals

Kabunyan: the supreme deity; also called Kadaklan (the Greatest), who drives bad spirits away, making the soil suitable for good crops
KiDul: the god of thunder
KiLat: the god of lightning
DumaNig: a demon which possesses the moon (Bolan) and causes her to devour her husband the sun (Ageo)
NamBisayunan: the howl or shriek that is heard during a storm
Libo-o d Ngatu: the clouds of the skyworld which cause sickness
Maman: beings derived from a second death of souls in the afterworld; they are perceptible in red light, as on a rainy day near sunset; may cause sickness
Bungun: the god of the rainbow
Mamlindao: hunting spirits
Bulaiyao: live in big rocks, hot springs, and volcanoes; have a fiery appearance which they can turn on or turn off; capture or devour souls
Gulilingob ud Tangob: the strongest of all the bulaiyao
Dumabag: the god of the volcano at Balatok
Lumawig: the local god of the Mangali-Lubo-Tinglaiyan district
Angako d Ngato: demons that afflict with sickness
Angtan: goddesses or demons that depress men, bring worry and bad luck
ALan: cannibal or ghoul spirits that figure largely in myths and folktales as carrying away or devouring souls and as producing many kinds of transformations in men and in themselves
Anitu: the souls of the dead
Pinading: extraordinary souls of the dead that have attained a superior power and existence
Gittam: a giant who established himself in the realm called Daya after killing many humans; lives in an island out in a big lake
Python of Gittam: protects the habitat of Gittam; swallowed a boy, who was rescued by a hero by killing the giant python
Iyu: water creatures who swim in the lakes of Lagud; depicted as a whale, an eel, a dragon, or, in some cases, a python also called Malaga

Ibanag

Immortals

Makapangwa: The supreme being also known as "Yafu"

Invisible Beings – Y Ari na Masingan

Aran: Tiny human-like beings that reside in trees, anthills, dark spaces and are neither evil nor good.
Aggirigira: Invisible beings that cause mischief, diseases and misfortunes
Anitu: Ancestor Spirits

Mortals

Biuag: a culture hero who possessed a golden lace amulet
Malana: a culture hero who possessed a golden axe amulet

Gaddang

Immortals

Nanolay: creator of all things; a culture hero and a beneficent deity; never inflicts pain or punishment on the people; responsible for the origin and development of the world
Ofag: cousin of Nanolay; personification of evil
Talanganay: a male god-spirit; enters the body of a healer and gives instructions on how to heal the sick while in a trance
Menalam: a female goddess-spirit; enters the body of a healer and gives instructions on how to heal the sick while in a trance
Bunag: god of the earth
Limat: god of the sea

Mortals

Biuag: a culture hero; ally of Malana
Malana: a culture hero; ally of Biuag
Magat: a culture hero
Battalan: a culture hero
Bayun: a culture hero

Bontok

Immortals

Intutungcho (Kabunian): the supreme deity living above; also referred to as Kabunian; father of Lumawig and two other sons
Lumawig: also referred as the supreme deity and the second son of Kabunian; an epic hero who taught the Bontoc their five core values for an egalitarian society
First Son of Kabunian
Third Son of Kabunian
Chal-chal: the god of the sun whose son's head was cut off by Kabigat; aided the god Lumawig in finding a spouse
Kabigat: the goddess of the moon who cut of the head of Chal-chal's son; her action is the origin of headhunting
Son of Chal-chal: his head was cut off by Kabigat; revived by Chal-chal, who bear no ill will against Kabigat
Ob-Obanan: a deity whose white hair is inhabited by insects, ants, centipedes, and all the vermins that bother mankind; punished a man for his rudeness by giving him a basket filled with all the insects and reptiles in the world
Chacha’: the god of warriors
Ked-Yem: the god of blacksmiths who cut off the heads of the two sons of Chacha’ because they were destroying his work; was later challenged by Chacha’, which eventually led into a pechen pact to stop the fighting
Two Sons of Chacha’: beheaded by Ked-Yem, because they were destroying his work

Mortals

Fucan: younger of the two girls met by Lumawig in Lanao; married to Lumawig; later adopted the name Cayapon; died after dancing in a taboo way, which led to death being the norm among mortals
Two Sons of Cayapon: the two children of Lumawig and Fucan; helped the people of Caneo, who afterwards killed by the two brothers
Batanga: father of the two girls met by Lumawig in Lanao

Ifugao

Immortals

Kabunian: supreme deity and chief among the high ranking deities above the skyworld; also referred to as Mah-nongan, chief god generally referred to as the honorary dead and creator of all things; in specific communities, both the names Mah-nongan and Kabunian (also Afunijon) are understood as the name of one chief deity, while in others, they are used to refer to many deities
Afunijon: also a general term referred to the deities of heaven, which is also called Afunijon
Mah-nongan: also a general term for deities who are given animal sacrifices
Ampual: the god of the fourth skyworld who bestowed animals and plants on the people; controls the transplanting of rice
Bumingi: in charge of worms, one of the eleven beings importuned to stamp out rice pests
Liddum: the only deity who inhabits the realm called Kabunian; communicates directly with humans on earth; chief mediator between the people and other gods
Lumadab: has the power to dry up the rice leaves, one of the eleven beings importuned to stamp out rice pests
Mamiyo: the stretcher of skeins, one of the twenty-three deities presiding over the art of weaving
Monlolot: the winder of thread on the spindle, one of the twenty-three deities presiding over the art of weaving
Puwok: controls the dread typhoons
Yogyog: a causer of earthquakes; dwells in the underworld
Alyog: a causer of earthquakes; dwells in the underworld
Kolyog: the god of earthquakes
Makalun: spirits that serve the function as messengers of the gods
Namtogan: the paraplegic god of good fortune whose presence made rice harvests and community livestock bountiful; when the humans he was staying with at Ahin began neglecting the bulul, he left, causing a curse of misfortunes; the people persuaded him to return, where he responded by teaching the people how to create bululs and how to do the rituals for the statues, effectively lifting the curse
Bulol: household divinities that are the souls of departed ancestors; usually depicted as carved wooden statues stored in the rice granary; the ancestral images guard the crops, make the rice harvest plentiful, and protects the rice from pests and thieves and from being too quickly consumed
Nabulul: spouse of Bugan; a god who possesses or lives in Bulul figures; guards the rice and make the rice harvest plentiful
Bugan: spouse of Nabulul; a goddess who possesses or lives in Bulul figures; guards the rice and make the rice harvest plentiful
Gatui: divinities associated with practical jokes, but have a malevolent side that feast on souls and cause miscarriages
Tagbayan: divinities associated with death that feast on human souls that are guarded by two headed monsters called kikilan
Imbayan: also called Lingayan; divinities who guide souls after they die
Himpugtan: an Imbayan divinity who can terminate those that displease him
Munduntug: divinities from the mountains who cause hunters to be lost
Banig: spirits of the hillsides and caves; among the Mayayao, the Banig take in the form of an animal who does not harm anyone, despite the people being afraid of their manifestation
Mun-apoh: deified ancestral spirits who are guardians and sources of blessings provided by the living; they are respected, however, their blessings could also be turned into a curse
Mahipnat: great spirits of sacred places
Bibao: spirits of ordinary places
Halupi: divinities of remembrance
Fili: divinities of property
Dadungut: divinities who dwell in graveyards and tombs
Makiubaya: divinities who watch over the gates of the village
Spirits of sickness
Libligayu
Hibalot
Binudbud: spirits that are invoked during feasts to quell the passions of men
Kolkolibag: spirits who cause difficult labor
Indu: spirits that make omens
Hidit: divinities who give punishments to those that break taboos
Puok: a kind of Hidit who use winds to destroy the dwellings of miners that break taboos
Hipag: spirits of war that give soldiers courage on the field of war but are ferocious and cannibalistic
Llokesin: the god of rats who figures in the myth of the first orange tree
Bumabakal: the rejected corpse divinity of the skyworld; his dead body resides on top of Mount Dukutan, where his bodily fluids cause boils
Kabigat: the god who sent a deluge which flooded the earth; married to the goddess Bugan
Bugan: a goddess married to Kabigat; her children are a son named Wigan and a daughter also named Bugan
Bugan: daughter of Bugan and Kabigat; stranded on earth after the great deluge, and became one of the two ancestors of mankind
Wigan: son of Bugan and Kabigat; stranded on earth after the great deluge, and became one of the two ancestors of mankind
Wigan: the god of good harvest
Dumagid: a god who lived among the people of Benguet; married a mortal woman named Dugai and had a son named Ovug
Ovug: son of Dumagid and Dugai; was cut in half by his father, where one of his halves was reanimated in the skyworld, and the other on earth; the voice of the skyworld's Ovug is the source of lightning and sharp thunder, while the voice of the earth's Ovug is the source of low thunder
Bangan: the god who accompanied Dumagid in claiming Ovug from the earth
Aninitud chalom: deity of the underworld, whose anger is manifested in a sudden shaking of the earth
Aninitud angachar: deity of the sky world; causes lightning and thunder when unsatisfied with offerings
Mapatar: the sun deity of the sky in charge of daylight
Bulan: the moon deity of the night in charge of nighttime
Mi’lalabi: the star and constellation deities
Pinacheng: a group or class of deities usually living in caves, stones, creeks, rocks, and in every place; mislead and hide people
Fulor: a wood carved into an image of a dead person seated on a death chair; an antique which a spirit in it, who bring sickness, death, and unsuccessful crops when sacrifices are not offered
Inamah: a wooden plate and a home of spirits; destroying or selling it will put the family in danger

Mortals 

Dugai: the mortal mother of the split god Ovug; wife of the god Dumagid
Humidhid: the headman of a village in the upstream region of Daya who carved the first bulul statues from the haunted or supernatural tree named Bongbong
Unnamed Shaman: prayed to the deities, Nabulul and Bugan, to possess or live in the bulul statues carved by Humidhid
Wife of Namtogan: a mortal woman who the god Namtogan married when he stayed at the village of Ahin

Kalanguya (Ikalahan)

Immortals

Kabunyan: the almighty creator; also referred to as Agmattebew, the spirit who could not be seen; the mabaki ritual is held in the deity's honor during planting, harvesting, birth and death of the people, and other activities for livelihood

Kankanaey

Immortals

Lumawig: the supreme deity; creator of the universe and preserver of life
Bugan: married to Lumawig
Bangan: the goddess of romance; a daughter of Bugan and Lumawig
Obban: the goddess of reproduction; a daughter of Bugan and Lumawig
Kabigat: one of the deities who contact mankind through spirits called anito and their ancestral spirits
Balitok: one of the deities who contact mankind through spirits called anito and their ancestral spirits
Wigan: one of the deities who contact mankind through spirits called anito and their ancestral spirits
Timugan: two brothers who took their sankah (handspades) and kayabang (baskets) and dug a hole into the lower world, Aduongan; interrupted by the deity Masaken; one of the two agreed to marry one of Masaken's daughters, but they both went back to earth when the found that the people of Aduongan were cannibals
Masaken: ruler of the underworld who interrupted the Timugan brothers

Ibaloi

Immortals

Kabunian: the supreme deity and the origin of rice; Kabunian is also the general term for deities
Moon Deity: the deity who teased Kabunian for not yet having a spouse
Child of Kabunian: the child of Kabunian with a mortal woman; split in half, where one part became lightning and the other became thunder
Matono: a brave woman who adventured into the underworld and saw the causes of poor crops and earthquakes; she afterwards reported her studies to the people of the earth; during the kosdëy, the people pray to her to not permit the rice, camotes, and other things to grow down, but to cause them to grow up
Kabigat (of where the water rises): journeyed into the underworld to retrieve trees which became the forests of the middle world
Kabigat (of where the water empties): taught Kabigat (of where the water empties) how to safely get trees from the underworld
Masekën: ruler of the underworld with green eyebrows, red eyes, and a tail
Kabigat (of the east): a large man in the east who adopted Bangan
Bangan: son of Otot and adopted by Kabigat; a kind young man who loved both his father and foster-father; shared gold to the world though Kabigat
Otot: a large man in the west who perished due to an accident, while travelling with his son, Bangan; a tree of gold rose from his burial, where Kabunian fell the tree and all gold on earth scattered from it
Sun God: the deity who pushed up the skyworld and pushed down the underworld, creating earth, after he was hit by a man's arrow during the war between the peoples of the skyworld and the underworld

Mortals

Labangan: a man who was got the first grain of rice used by mankind from Kabunian
Wife of Kabunian: the spouse of Kabunian who bore their child, which was split into two and revived into lightning and thunder
Two Blind Women: two kind blind beggars in hunger who were driven away by their neighbors; fed by a woman who came from a rock and an old woman; one was given a sack or rice, while the other was given a bottle of water; when they returned home, they decided to replant the rice and distribute it to the people, while the bottle of water gushed out streams which also aided mankind

Bugkalot (Ilongot)

Immortals

Delan: deity of the moon, worshiped with the sun and stars; congenial with Elag; during quarrels, Elag sometimes covers Delan's face, causing the different phases of the moon; giver of light and growth
Elag: deity of the sun, worshiped with the moon and stars; has a magnificent house in the sky realm called Gacay; retreats to his home during nights; giver of light and growth
Pandac: deity of the stars, worshiped with the sun and moon; giver of light and growth
Cain: the headhunter creator of mankind; gave customs to the people; lived together with Abel in the sky but separated due to a quarrel
Abel: prayed to when wishing long lives for children; lived together with Cain in the sky but separated due to a quarrel
Keat: personification of lightning, depicted as the road of Cain and Abel
Kidu: personification of thunder, which follows Keat
Gemang: guardian of wild beasts
Oden: deity of the rain, worshiped for its life-giving waters
Tawen: personification of the sky
Kalao: spirit birds; depicted as red hornbills who guide and protect hunters and their soul
Be’tang: unpredictable shape-shifting spirit-creatures living in the forests or wilderness called Gongot; youth and softness are their properties, while they can also alter a human's sense of time; they may take the form of a white dog, a large deer, a horse with a hanging tongue, a naked woman, or beings with grotesque shapes, whose attributes range from long arms and legs, small heads, oversized feet, fur bodies, to hairless bodies; they may also enter a person's dreams or paralyze a human
Ga’ek Spirits: spirits in the Ga’ek magic plant used in relation to hunting and fishing; the naw-naw prayer is given to them

Ilocano

Immortals 

Unnamed Supreme God: the supreme god who tasked the primordial giants to initiate the creation of many things
Buni: possibly the name of the supreme god
Parsua: the creator deity
Primordial Giants
Anglao: also called Angalo; dug the earth and made the mountains, urinated into the holes in the earth and made the rivers and lakes, and put up the sky, the sun, the moon, and arranged the stars at the behest of the supreme god
Aran: one of the two primordial giants tasked with the creation of many things
Apo Langit: the deity of heaven
Apo Angin: the deity of wind
Apo Init: the deity of the sun
Apo Tudo: the deity of the rain
Abra: an old god who controls the weather; married to Makiling, the elder
Makiling (the elder): the goddess gave birth to Cabuyaran
Cabuyaran: the goddess of healing; daughter of Abra and Makiling, the elder; she eloped with Anianihan
Anianihan: the god of harvest who eloped with Cabuyaran He was chosen by Cabuyaran as her spouse, instead of her father's preferences such as Saguday, god of wind, or Revenador, god of thunder and lightning
Saguday: the god of the wind who is one of the two gods preferred by Abra to be his daughter's spouse
Revenador: the god of thunder and lightning who is one of the two gods preferred by Abra to his daughter's spouse
Bulan: the god of peace who comforted the grieving Abra
Amman: the god of the sun, where the sun is his eye
Makiling (the younger): granddaughter of Makiling, the elder; she is guarded by the dog god Lobo in the underworld
Lobo: a god who was punished to become a large dog guarding the entrance to the underworld
Unnamed God: the underworld god who punished Lobo
Dal'lang: the goddess of beauty
Sipnget: the goddess of darkness who requested Ang-ngalo to build her a mansion
Asin: ruler of the kingdom of salt, who aided Ang-ngalo in the building of a white mansion
Ocean Deity: the goddess of the ocean whose waters slammed the ediface of salt being built by Ang-ngalo and Asin, causing the sea's water to become salty
Apolaki: the name of a deity, which later was used to refer to the supreme deity of Christian converts

Mortals

Lam-ang: an epic hero who journeyed to avenge his father and court Ines Kannoyan; aided by the dog and the rooster, and in some versions, the cat as well
Namongan: mother of Lam-ang
Don Juan: father of Lam-ang
Ines Kannoyan: beautiful maiden who became the lover of Lam-ang; aided the resurrection of Lam-ang
Horned Presidente: a presidente of a town who wished to have horns to frighten the people under his rule and keep them under his control; his wish backfired as the people perceived him as worse than an animal; he continued to demand to be the ruler despite his people withdrawing their support, which eventually led to his death

Pangasinense

Immortals 

Ama-Gaolay: the supreme deity; simply referred as Ama, the ruler of others, and the creator of mankind; sees everything through his aerial abode; father of Agueo and Bulan
Agueo: the morose and taciturn sun god who is obedient to his father, Ama; lives in a palace of light
Bulan: the merry and mischievous moon god, whose dim palace was the source of the perpetual light which became the stars; guides the ways of thieves
Apolaqui: a war god; also called Apolaki, his name was later used to refer to the god of Christian converts
Anito: spirits who lurk everywhere; capable of inflicting pain and suffering, or of granting rewards
Gods of the Pistay Dayat: gods who are pacified through the Pistay Dayat ritual, where offerings are given to the spirits of the waters who pacify the gods

Mortals

Urduja: a warrior princess who headed a supreme fleet
Rizal: a culture-hero who, according to tradition, will return to aid his people in their struggle for victory and genuine freedom

Sambal

Immortals 

Malayari: also called Apo Namalyari, the supreme deity and creator
Akasi: the god of health and sickness; sometimes seen at the same level of power as Malayari
 Kayamanan: the goddess of wealth in Sambal mythology; with Kainomayan, the goddess of plenty, she aided a farmer by bringing him good fortune, however, the farmer became greedy; as punishment, she transformed the farmer into a swarm of locusts
Deities in Charge of the Rice Harvest
Dumangan: god of good harvest
Kalasakas: god of early ripening of rice stalks
Kalasokus: god of turning grain yellow and dry
Damulag: also called Damolag, god of protecting fruiting rice from the elements
Manglubar: the god of peaceful living
Mangalagar: the goddess of good grace
Anitun Tauo: the goddess of wind and rain who was reduced in rank by Malayari for her conceit
Apolaqui: personal deity of a priestess

Aeta (Agta, Ayta)

Immortals 

Great Creator: the god who created all things; used to come down and talk to people before the great flood; rules the earth through Tigbalog, Lueve, Amas, and Binangewan
Gutugutumakkan: the supreme deity, possibly the name of the Great Creator
Apu Namalyari: a deity who lives in Mount Pinatubo; also called Apo Pinatubo and Apo na Malyari; also referred as the supreme deity
Tigbalog: gives life and directs activities
Lueve: directs production and growth
Amas: moves to pity, love, unity, and peace of heart
Binangewan: spirits who bring change, sickness, and death as punishment
Matusalem: the creator's representatives who act as mediators between the creator and humans since after the great flood
Algao: the sun god who battled Bacobaco
Bacobaco: an ancient turtle who burrowed on top of Mount Pinatubo after its battle with Algao; eruptions occur when it resurfaces
Kedes: god of the hunt
Pawi: god of the forest
Sedsed: god of the sea

Kapampangan

Immortals 

Mangetchay: also called Mangatia; the supreme deity who created life on earth in remembrance of his dead daughter; lives in the sun in other versions, she is the creator and net-weaver of the heavens
Daughter of Mechetchay: a daughter of Mangetchay whose beauty sparked the great war between the gods, leading to the formation of the earth through stones thrown by the deities; lived on the planet Venus
Wife of Mangetchay: wife of Mangetchay who gave birth to their daughter whose beauty sparked the great war; lives in the moon
Suku: also called Sinukwan, a gigantic being who radiated positive traits
Makiling: a goddess who married Suku
Malagu: goddess of beauty who married a mortal; daughter of Makiling and Suku
Mahinhin: goddess of modesty who married a mortal; daughter of Makiling and Suku
Matimtiman: goddess of charm who married a mortal; daughter of Makiling and Suku
Aring Sinukûan: sun god of war and death, taught the early inhabitants the industry of metallurgy, wood cutting, rice culture and even waging war; lives in Mount Arayat, and later included a female form; rules over Arayat together with the deity, Mingan
Mingan: a deity who rules with Sinukuan over Arayat, also called Kalaya and Alaya
Apolaqui: sun god who battled his sister, Mayari
Mayari: the moon goddess who battled her brother, Apolaqui
Apûng Malyari: moon god who lives in Mt. Pinatubo and ruler of the eight rivers
Tálâ: the bright star, the one who introduced wet-rice culture
Munag Sumalâ: the golden serpent child of Aring Sinukuan; represents dawn
Lakandanup: son of Aring Sinukuan; the god of gluttony and represents the sun at noon time
Gatpanapun: son of Aring Sinukuan; the noble who only knew pleasure and represents the afternoon
Sisilim: child of Apûng Malyari; she represents the dusk and is greeted by the songs of the cicada upon her arrival
Galurâ: winged assistant of Aring Sinukuan; a giant eagle and the bringer of storms
Nága: serpent deities known for their protective nature; their presence in structures are talismans against fire
Lakandanum: variant of the Naga, known to rule the waters
Lakandánup: serpent goddess who comes during total eclipses; followed by famine; eats a person's shadow, which will result in withering and death; daughter of Áring Sínukuan and Dápu
Apung Iru (Lord of the River) – was depicted as gigantic cosmic crocodile that supported the earth on its back, and was located under the great World River. If angered, Apung Iru caused the rivers to flood; hence, this is the origin of libad or the water procession during the full moon nearest to the summer solstice, which takes place in the yearly celebration called Bayung Danum (New Water) to appease the deity. 
Dápu: crocodile deity who holds the earth on her back; a nunu or earth goddess, and known as the mother ocean
Láwû: a giant creature similar to a mixture of a bird, a serpent, and a crocodile who seeks to swallow Aldó and Búlan; the soul of Dápu who does her bidding as Dápu has been weakened when her belly burst; in another, less common, version, Láwû is the ghost of Dápu; while in another, Láwû is the descendant of Dápu, seeking revenge for the deity's mother
Batálâ : kingfisher deity, known as the father sky; known as Salaksak, he was swallowed by Dápu, where he dissolved and his two souls came out, bursting out of Dápu's belly
Souls of Batálâ
Aldó: the white fiery bird
Búlan: the red fiery bird
Rizal: a culture-hero who will return through resurrection to aid his people in their struggle
Felipe Salvador: a hero who will someday return to the people to help them in their struggle; based on a historical person

Mortals

Piriang: a prideful maiden who would rather marry a demon than a poor man
Guanchiango: a man who was deceived by a demon, who he released from a jar

Tagalog

Ancient Tagalog deities documented by the Spaniards 

Arao (Araw = sun) – According to Juan de Plasencia, the ancient Tagalogs worshiped the sun on account of its beauty. When it rains with sunshine and the sky is somewhat red, they say that the anitos get together to give them war. And they are, and with great fear, and neither women nor children allow them to come down from the houses, until it clears and the sky becomes clear. During solar eclipse (limlim), the sun was said to cover its face, no special ceremony is reported unlike in the case of lunar eclipse.
Alagaca (Alagaka) – The protector of hunters. 
Alpriapo (The priapus) – An idol mentioned by an anonymous contemporary of Plasencia: "They worshiped idols which were called Alpriapo, Lacapati, and Meilupa, but God has, in His goodness, enlightened them with the grace of His divine gospel, and they worship the living God in spirit." The Spanish term Alpriapo "the priapus" is left untranslated. Apparently the Spanish chronicler did not know the Tagalog name of this deity. They could be referring to Dian Masalanta. 
Amanicable (Ama-ni-Kable = father of Kable) – The advocate and protector of hunters. In ancient Tagalog customs, the first son or daughter gave the surname to the parents, e.g. Amani Maliuag, Ynani Malacas, "the father of Maliuag," "the mother of Malacas." Therefore, Amanicable could be the surname of either Paglingñalan or Alagaca or both if they are identical.
Amansinaya (Amang Sinaya = father of Sinaya) – The advocate of fishermen, who is said to be the inventor of fishing gear. Before casting their nets or fishing lines, the fishermen would first whistle and then pray to Amansinaya saying, "Kasumpa ako, naway diriyan" which meant "I am your sworn friend, let it be there", in reference to the fish. According to San Buenaventura dictionary (1613), the meaning of Amansinaya is "Father of sinaya" (Padre de sinaya). In ancient Tagalog customs, the first son or daughter gave the surname to the parents, e.g. Amani Maliuag, Ynani Malacas, "the father of Maliuag," "the mother of Malacas." The connector "ni" could be replaced by the linker, e.g. <Amang Juan> Amáñg Suwáñ (Mag. 1679:3) "Juan's father". The term sinaya means "the first catch of a fishnet, fishtrap, or a hunting dog". Pasinaya is a term used as an invitation to share a first catch. According to Francisco Colin, fishermen would not make use of the first cast of the net or a new fish-corral, for they thought that they would get no more fish if they did the opposite. Neither must one talk in the fisherman's house of his new nets, or in that of the hunter of dogs recently purchased, until they had made a capture or had some good luck; for if they did not observe that, the virtue was taken from the nets and the cunning from the dogs.
Badhala Catotobo (Bathala katutubo = fellow native/conborn bathala) – A sort of twin spirit called katutubo "fellow native" was born along with a person, and was in charge of protecting them during all their life. Catholic missionaries will use the term to refer to the guardian angel.
Balacbac (Balakbák) & Balantáy – The two guardians of Tanguban: the abode of the souls of the dead. Tanguban is divided into two regions: one is Maca or "kasanáan ng tuwa" ("a thousand joys") where the good souls temporarily stays pending resurrection; and the other is the "kasanáan ng hírap" ("a thousand pains") or simply Casanáan (Kasanáan), where the souls of the wicked went, which is said to be inhabited by devils called sitan. In classical Tagalog, the term sánà could either mean "abundance" or "destruction". It is possible that the term sánà "abundance" was borrowed from Arabic jannaţ "garden, paradise"; while the term sánà "destruction" was borrowed from Arabic jahannam "hell". The soul was said to be ferried on a boat by a Charon-like figure to the other shore (ibáyo) of an expanse of water now regarded as a wide river (ílog), now as a lake or a sea (dágat). The other world is probably deemed to be located where the sun was supposed to drown (lunod) every evening, hence tha name for the west kanlunúran > kanlúran.
Balangao/Balangau (Balangaw = rainbow) – According to Francisco Colin, the ancient Tagalogs attributed to the rainbow its kind of divinity. Colin also states " that the bird Tigmamanuquin derived its interpretation as a divinity from the rainbow." The rainbow was regarded as a divine sign and it is considered blasphemy to point finger at it. The rainbow was believed to be either Bathala's bridge (balaghari) or loincloth (bahaghari). The souls of those who: perished by the sword, were devoured by crocodiles or sharks, and killed by lightning; immediately ascends to Kaluwálhatian (glory) by means of the rainbow (balangaw) In classical Tagalog the proper name for the rainbow is Balangaw, while bahaghari was only a poetic term referring to Balangaw. Other terms for rainbow are balantok and bahagsubay. The rainbow is sometimes referred to as bathala or badhala, a title also attributed to heavenly bodies which predicted events. This deity should not be confused with Varangao (Barangaw) the Visayan god of rainbow, war, and plundering expedition.
Balátic ("the Crossbow : the Eagle, a constellation of three stars near the celestial equator, called Marineras or Tres Marías in Renaissance Spanish")
Balo - The anitos that haunts deserted places [otros anitos de los despoblados].
Bathala mei Capal (Bathala Maykapal = God the Creator) – The transcendent supreme being: the creator and ruler of the universe. Known under several names, titles, and epithets such as: Anatala, Molayare (Mulayari = source/origin of power/being), Dioata (Diwata = divinity/remote/very distant), Meylupa (Maylupa = owner of the earth), etc. He had many agents under him, whom he sent to this world to produce, in behalf of men, what is yielded here. These beings were called anitos (ancestral spirits), and each anito had a special office. Some of them were for the fields, and some for those who journey by sea; some for those who went to war, and some for diseases. The term "bathala" is a title attributed not only to the supreme being but also to personal tutelary anitos (Badhala catotobo), omen birds (Tigmamanuquin), the mountain which is the abode of Tigmamanuquin, comets and other heavenly bodies which the early Tagalog people believed predicted events. For this reason, some Spanish chroniclers had been lost in their account about Bathala Maykapal and promptly asserted that he is an alligator, a crow, a bird called tigmamanukin, a rainbow, etc.
Bibit – Generally diseases are attributed to a deity called Bibit. A strange belief because the deity is not presented as a malevolent one, but as being sick itself. If someone was sick they would make offerings of food to Bibit because the catalona had first to cure the deity before she was able to act as a physician and for the patient to recover.
Bingsól – The advocate of ploughmen. 
Bisô (Holeless-Eared) – The police officer of heaven. 
Boking/Bokong – an anito. 
Buan/Colalaiyng (Buwan = moon; Kulalaying = Jew's harp) – According to the Spanish chroniclers the ancient Tagalogs revered the moon (Buwan) as a deity, especially when it was new (the first sliver of the moon), at which time they held great rejoicings, adoring it and bidding it welcome, asking it to provide them with a lot of gold; others for a lot of rice; others that it give them a beautiful wife or a noble husband who is well-mannered and rich; others that it bestow on them health and long life; in short, everyone asks for what they most desire because they believe and are convinced it can give it to them abundantly. San Buenaventura dictionary lists a prayer dedicated to the moon that was recited during the new moon: "Buwáñg Panginóon kó, payamánin mó akó" which translates to "Moon, my Lord/Lady, make me rich." When one is on a mission no matter how important, it is well to desist from accomplishing the mission if a lunar eclipse occurs. A ring which appears around the moon is an indication of the demise of some chief. In these cases, the moon is referred to as bathala a title attributed to heavenly bodies which the early Tagalog people believed predicted events. Another name for the moon or the proper name for the anito of the moon is Colalaiyng {N&S 1754: 151-152: Colalaiyng. pc. Asi llamaban á la luna, ó á una doncella en la luna, segun sus consejas.}. The Tagalogs from Laguna called her "Dalágañg nása Buwán"  (Maiden in the Moon), in reference to the image formed by the shadow on the moon, which they see as a face (sangmukti) of a young maid (doncella). Ceremonies of her cult were regularly performed at the new moon and the full moon with offerings of roosters made to fly in her direction. She was also referred to as "Dalágañg Binúbúkot" (Cloistered Maiden). In ancient Tagalog society, some virgins were cloistered like nuns or as amongst Muslims, the term used to refer to them were binúkot (SB 1613:279; N&S 1860:266) and kinalî (N&S 1860:266; Pang. 1972:287). The reason for this custom is not explained, but may have been a Muslim one.
Bulac-pandan (Búlak Pandán = Flower of Pandan) 
Bulactala (Búlak Tálà = "Flower of Tala" i.e. the planet Venus) – The anito of the planet Venus (tala).
Capiso Pabalita (Kapiso Pabalítà = News-giving) – The protector of travelers. 
Cirit/Zirit (Sirit = Snake's hiss) – A servant of the anitos. 
Dian Masalanta (Diyan Masalanta = the blind deity; the devastating deity) – The advocate of lovers and of generation (procreation). The meaning of the name Dian Masalanta is not provided, but according to the author Jean-Paul G. Potet (Ancient Beliefs and Customs of the Tagalogs, 2018) the meaning could be "the blind deity" [dian "deity", ma – "adj. prefic" + salanta "blindness"]. Masalanta (devastating) comes from the root word salanta, which in the Noceda and Sanlucar Vocabulario de la lengua Tagala (1754)" and the San Buenaventura dictionary (1613) lists the meaning as "poor, needy, crippled, and blind". Generally, magsalanta and nasalanta, which means "is destroyed/devastated", is used when there is a calamity such as: a typhoon, flood, or earthquake. Therefore, Dian Masalanta could also mean "devastating deity". 
Dingali – A particular type of family-anitos. 
Guinarawan (Ginarawan) – an evil spirit. 
Guinoong Dalaga (Ginúoñg Dalága= lady maiden) – The anito of the crops. 
Guinoong Ganay (Ginúoñg Gánay = lady old maid) – According to Luciano P. R. Santiago, Guinoong Ganay is the advocate of single women that inhabit the Calumpang tree. 
Guinoong Panay (Ginúoñg Panáy = lady "syzygium/tuffy"?) – the anito of kalumpang tree (Sterculia foetida). 
Guinoong Pagsohotan (Ginúoñg Pagsuotán = clothing lady) – The protectress of women in travail. 
Hasangan (Hasanggán) – A terrible anito. 
Húya/Tumanor (Tumanod = warden) – an ill-famed idol that crept under houses. On hearing it, people threw ashes, and struck the floor while saying: "Iri-iri ya, si Húya!" (SB 1613:36) [= "Take that, Huya!"] – his name is apparently assimilated to the (marriage) pancake called madhúyà (marúyà) and the ashes being a parody for flour.
Ídianale (Í-diyanale = mother of Diyánale) – Lacapati and Ídianale were the patrons of cultivated lands and of husbandry. In ancient Tagalog customs, the first son or daughter gave the surname to the parents, e.g. Amani Maliuag, Ynani Malacas, "the father of Maliuag," "the mother of Malacas." Amá and iná could be respectively reduced to a- and i- and used as prefixes (probably stressed) to the child's name, e.g. Á-Pálad "Palad's father", Í-Pálad "Palad's mother". Therefore, Ídianale is a surname of a female anito.
Lacambini/Lacandaytan (Lakambini = calm/repose/modest lord; Lakang Daitan = lord of attachment) – The protector of the throat, and the advocate in case of throat ailment. Some author wrongly transcribed his name as Lacambui, and according to them he is the god of the ancient Tagalogs who fed. Isabelo de los Reyes also referred to this anito as Lakan-busog and equates him with the Visayan diwata named Makabosog; and the kibaan of Ilocanos that gives his friend a pot that produces all kinds of food. The Tagalog title "laka" (lakan) come from Java "raka" "lord" found in the Kalasan inscription dated S'ka 700/22 March 779 (Juan Francisco 1971:151) [Potet, T customs, 37]. According to Francisco Colin (1663), the title "Lacan or Gat" is the equivalent to the Spanish "Don", and that the Don (Doña) of women is not Lacan or Gat but "Dayang". This indicate that the gender of this anito is "male". In contemporary Tagalog Dictionaries, the meaning of this term is given as "a muse , a charming beautiful lady".
La Campinay (Lakampinay) – The Old Midwife. The Tagalog title "laka" (lakan) come from Java "raka" "lord" found in the Kalasan inscription dated S'ka 700/22 March 779 (Juan Francisco 1971:151). According to Francisco Colin (1663), the title "Lacan or Gat" is the equivalent to the Spanish "Don", and that the Don (Doña) of women is not Lacan or Gat but "Dayang". This indicates that La Campinay is a "male midwife", which is not uncommon in southeast Asia. 
Lacan Balingasay (Lakang Balingasay) – Father Juan de Oliver in his Declaracion de la Doctrina Christiana en idioma tagalog (1599). While preaching in Batangas, he mentioned Lakan Balingasay and compared him to Beelzebub: "malaking anito ang pangalang Belzebu, na kun baga dito Lakan Balingasay." Balingasay is a wood derived from Buchanania arborescens, a type of fruit bearing species that is commonly found in Luzon. 
Lacapati (Lakapati, from Sanskrit Locapati = Lord of the world) – The major fertility deity, fittingly represented by an image of a man and a woman joined (androgyne) that signifies the procreative power of heterosexual union. He was the advocate of sowed fields, of husbandry, and of vagrants and waifs. Sacrifices of food and words are made to him by the ancient Tagalogs, asking for water for their fields and for him to give them fish when they go fishing in the sea, saying if they do not do this, they would have no water for their field and much less would they catch any fish when they go fishing. During rituals and offerings—known as maganito—in the fields and during the planting season, farmers would hold a child up in the air while invoking Lakapati and chant "Lakapati, pakanin mo yaring alipin mo; huwag mo gutumin." (Translation: Lakapati, feed this thy slave; let him not hunger). Other authors described him as a hemaphrodite devil who satisfies his carnal appetite with men and women. This could be a misinterpretation of Lacapati's relation to the catalonas (shamans). In Ngaju Dayak religion, the shaman's altered state of consciousness is likened to male/female sexual intercourse: the shaman work in an embodiment transtate that is considered feminine or receptive; the deity, is considered masculine or the dynamic, entering force. Unlike the name "Lacambini" (Lakambini) or Lacan Baliñgasay (Lakang Balingasay), the linker (e.g. m, ng, n) between laka and pati is not used because this name has a different origin: Sanskrit loka-pati = "lord of the world" (an epithet of "Brahman the Creator" and "Vishnu the Preserver"); Sans. loka = location, the earth, field + Sans. pati = lord. 
Lachanbacor (Lakhang Bakod = lacquered fence) – An ithyphallic deity. The anito of the fruits of the earth and protector of swiddens. His image or wooden statue is described as having gold eyes and teeth and a gilded genitalia as long as a rice stalk; its body is completely hollow. When the people needed his help, they hold a banquet and revel in the fields under a canopy that they construct there for this purpose and where they erect a kind of altar. On this altar they place his wooden statue. And those making the sacrifice form a ring and eat and feast. And they have the priests (catalona) place some of the food they are to eat in the mouth of the statue; they also give him some of the beverage they are to drink. And they are convinced that by reciting some superstitious words he will give them the very good and abundant fruits asked of him. He was offered eels when fencing swiddens—because, they said, his were the strongest  of all fences, "linalachan niya ang bacor nang bucqir" ("He lacquered the fences of the field"). Lacha (Lakha) means "red lacquer". Some authors say he is the god who cured diseases, for this reason Isabelo de los Reyes compared him with the kibaans of Ilocanos that nests in the plants that serve as fences (living fences) and cured illnesses. 
Laho (from the Asura named Rahu) – The serpent or dragon who was believed to devour the moon and cause lunar eclipse. When the moon is eclipsed, the people of various districts generally go out into the street or into the open fields, with bells, panastanes, etc. They strike them with great force and violence in order that they might thereby protect the moon which they say is being eaten or swallowed by the dragon, tiger, or crocodile. If they wish to say "the eclipse of the moon" it is very common among them to use this locution, saying "Linamon laho bovan" ("Laho is swallowing the moon"). The Spaniards believed that the Tagalogs learned this practice from the Sangley (Chinese). 
Lampinsaca (Lampinsákà = cripple) – The advocate of the lame and the cripple. 
Linğa (Linggá = from Sanskrit "lingam", the phallic symbol of the Hindu god "Shiva the Destroyer") – The anito who was invoked in case of sickness. Like his contemporaries, the Spanish lexicographer who recorded this term did not have the necessary knowledge to identify it. In early Sanskrit medical texts, linga means "symptom, signs" and plays a key role in the diagnosis of a sickness, the disease. 
Macapulao (Makapúlaw = watcher) – The advocate of sailors. 
Macatalubhay (Makatalubháy) – The anito of bananas. 
Mancocotor (Mangkukutud) – The advocate of manunuba (tuba tappers/coconut wine makers) and protector of coconut palm trees. Offering is made to him by the manunubas before climbing a tree, lest they ran the risk of a fall from the trunk.
Magináong Sungmásandāl (Maginúoñg Sungmásandāl = Lord "the one that keeps close") 
Maguinoong Campongan (Maginúoñg Kampungán = lord supporter) – The anito of harvest and sown fields. 
Mapolon (Mapúlon = Pleiades)
Quinon sana (Kinunsánà) – The name of the supreme deity among mountaineers (Boxer 2016:66/67). Schol. This is an -in-derivative of *kunsánà, itself a kun- derivative of sánà "abundance". The prefix kun- is also found in wárì "opinion" < kunwárì "fake". The god of the fields and of the jungles to whom sacrifices of food are made by the priests called catalona, beseeching him to do them no harm or injury while they are in their fields or the jungle. They perform this sacrifice and hold this banquet for him in order to keep him satisfied and benevolent. The Tagalogs should have no native word for 'forest' is no less surprising than their lack of terms for 'volcano' and 'lava'. ZORC (1993) is of the opinion that there must have existed native Tagalog terms, and that they disappeared from the language because they were taboo: uttering them would have called the attention of the corresponding wrathful gods. 
Paalolong (Paalúlong = barker) – The advocate of the sick and the dead. 
Paglingñalan (Paglingniyalán) – The advocate of hunters.
Pagvaagan (Pagwaagán) – the anito of the winds. 
Pilipit (Spiral) – the ancient Tagalogs swear their oaths to a statuette of a deity or monstrous beast, they called Pilipit, that would devour a perjurer. San Buenaventura (1613:369) describes the Pilipit as a devil figure; a ceramic cat apparently made in China. The oath could also be taken on a substitute – a snail bearing the same name, both having a twisted appearance. According to Francisco Colin, when the chiefs of Manila and Tondo swore allegiance to the Catholic sovereigns, in the year one thousand five hundred and seventy-one, they confirmed the peace agreements and the subjection with an oath, asking "the sun to pierce them through the middle, the crocodiles to eat them, and the women not to show them any favor or wish them well, if they broke their word." Sometimes they performed the pasambahan for greater solemnity and confirmation of the oath. That consisted in bringing forward the figure of some monstrous beast asking that they might be broken into pieces by it if they failed in their promise. According to Father Noceda and Blumentritt, the Tagalogs called Pasambahan the place where they took oath before the figure of a very ugly animal. 
Posor-lupa (Púsod-Lúpā = earth navel) – the anito of the fields. 
Sayc (Sayik, from Arabic shaykh = sheikh. This name was wrongly transcribed as Hayc in the English translation of the Boxer Codex.) – The anito of the sea. Seamen before they set sail sponsored a major ceremony (maganito) wherein sacrifices of banquets and food are offered to him, through a catalona, asking him to protect them from tempests and storms when traveling by sea, and to grant them good weather and favorable calm winds.
Siac Matanda (Siyák Matandâ = old sheikh) – The advocate of merchants and second-hand dealers. 
Siukuy (Siyokoy = from Chinese Mandarin "shuǐguǐ" which means "water ghost") – the anito of the rivers [Era el dios de los ríos de los tágalos antiguos]. In modern Tagalog folklore, siyokoy are sea monsters, an anthropoid whose body is covered in glistening brown or green fish scales and webbet feet; some description also give them long, green tentacles and gill slits; they drown fishermen and consume them for food. 
Tala (the plane Venus)
Tauong Damo (Tawong Damo) – Wicked anitos or savaged mountain gods believed to be responsible for the abortion. According to Blumentritt, the anitos that inspired so much fear among the Tagalogs, such as those that lived in the forest, seem to be the anitos of the old owners or natives of the regions that was occupied by the immigrant Tagalogs. Linguists such as David Zorc and Robert Blust speculate that the Tagalogs and other Central Philippine ethno-linguistic groups originated in Northeastern Mindanao or the Eastern Visayas.
 The first midwife in the world – An unnamed deity, mentioned in the Boxer Codex (1590), called "the first midwife in the world"; to whom the midwives, when they do their job, prayed to saying: "Oh you, first midwife, whose office I now do by your will, please give me so that through my help this creature may come to light ". They could be referring to Lacampinay, the old midwife. 
Unnamed anito of the house – whose favor they implored whenever an infant was born, and when it was suckled and the breast offered to it.
Unnamed ferryman of the dead – The ancient Tagalogs believed that when a man died, his soul was obliged to pass a river or lake where there was a boat rowed by an old boatman; and to pay his passage they fastened some money on the arm of the dead man (Aduarte 1640). The unnamed ferryman could be Paalolong, the god of the sick and of the dead.
 Unnamed husband-and-wife deities – In the Pardo inquisition report (1686), the inquisitor found bamboo goblets, pebbles, and skeins of hair, and a one-piece stone statue representing husband-and-wife deities.
 Unnamed serpent deity – The priestesses and her acolytes of the town of Santo Tomas, Laguna de Bay, interrogated by the Dominican inquisitors from the University of Santo Tomas, Manila, answered that, when they performed a ceremony in a cave, used as a temple, a deity would appear to them in the shape of a python (sawa). Usually, it is reported that the spirit—whether that of a deity or an ancestor—took the form of a shadow (aníno) to enter the body of the shaman. The sound of a flute was heard when the spirit was present (Boxer 2016:82/83). In their dreams, the shaman saw these spirits as a black man (itím na laláki) or a wild water buffalo (anwáng). Similarly, a mountain spirit called tigbálang was perceived as a black ghost, hence Anáki'ý ikáw ay tigbálang "You look like a mountain spirit." Said to a person dressed in black attires. The spirit appearing as a python to the congregation is an exception.

Tagalog pantheon from "Notes on Philippine Divinities" by F. Landa Jocano 

Bathala or Abba – The highest ranking deity and creator of all things. He had three daughters to a mortal wife – Mayari, Hana, and Tala. In classical Tagalog, the term "bathala" is a title attributed not only to the supreme being but also to personal tutelary anitos (Badhala catotobo), omen birds (Tigmamanuquin), the mountain which is the abode of Tigmamanuquin (Tigmamanukin), comets and other heavenly bodies which the early Tagalog people believed predicted events. Abba is the name of the god in the sky worshipped by the people of Limasawa.
Idianali – The goddess of labor and good deeds. Wife of Dumangan, mother of Dumakulem.
Dumangan – The god of good harvest. Husband of Idianali, father of Dumakulem. Dumangan is the Sambal god of harvest and giver of grain.
Amanikabli – The husky, ill-tempered ruler of the sea. He is the syncretization of Amanikable (the anito of hunters) and  Kablay, a rich, old man in Zambales legend who owned several fishing boats. In this legend, Kablay refused to give alms to a spirit of the sea in the guise of an old beggar man. For his punishment he was transformed into a shark.
Dumakulem – A strong, agile hunter who became the guardian of created mountains. Son of Idianali and Dumangan. He was derived from Domakolen, the god of the Bagobos who created mountains.
Anitun Tabu – The fickle-minded goddess of the wind and rain. She was derived from the Sambal deity Anitun Tauo.
Mayari – The goddess of the moon. Daughter of Bathala to a mortal wife. She was derived from the Kapampangan lunar goddess of the same name. Mayari could also be derived from the Sambal deity Malayari.
Hana – The goddess of the morning. Daughter of Bathala to a mortal wife. She was derived from Hanan a Visayan hero god who gave the morning dawn.
Tala – The goddess of the stars. Daughter of Bathala to a mortal wife.  
Ikapati – The goddess of cultivated land. Wife of Mapulon, mother of Anagolay. She was derived from the Sambal goddess of the same name. The Tagalog deity Lacapati was first documented in the Boxer Codex (1590) as possibly male, whose pronoun are he/him. Then as a "figure of man and woman joined together" (androgyne) in Vocabulario de la lengua tagala (1613).
Mapulon – The god of season. Husband of Ikapati, father of Anagolay.
Anagolay – The goddess of loss things. Wife of Dumakulem, mother of Apolaki and Dian Masalanta. Possibly derived from either Anagaoley, the supreme god of the ancient Pangasineses; or Amanolay, a god of the Gaddanes.
Apolaki – The god of the sun and patron of fighters. Son of Dumakulem and Anagolay, brother of Dian Masalanta. Apolaki is the supreme god of the ancient Pangasinenses whom they also referred to as Anagaoley or Amagaoley (Supreme Father). In Kapampangan mythology, he is a son of Bathala and brother of Mayari. The Bolinao manuscript mentions the Sambal priestess Bolindauan in 1684 who has Apolaqui as her patron anito. 
Dian Masalanta – The goddess of lovers. Daughter of Dumakulem and Anagolay, sister of Apolaki. 
Sitan – The chief deity of Kasanaan: the village of grief and affliction. He was assisted by many mortal agents such as: Mangagauay, Manisilat, Mankukulam, Hukluban. Sitan is mentioned by Juan de Plasencia in Customs of the Tagalogs (1589) as "devils" inhabiting the Casanaan (hell).
Agents of Sitan:
Mangagauay – The one responsible for the occurrence of diseases. Mentioned by Juan de Plasencia in "Customs of the Tagalogs" (1589) as a type of witch or class of priest.
Manisilat – The goddess of broken homes. Mentioned by Juan de Plasencia in "Customs of the Tagalogs" (1589) as a type of witch or class of priest.
Mankukulam – Who often assumes human form and went around the villages, pretending to be a priest-doctor. Then he would wallow in the filth beneath the house of his victim and emit fire. If the fire was extinguished immediately, the victim would die. Mentioned by Juan de Plasencia in "Customs of the Tagalogs" (1589) as a type of witch or class of priest.
Hukluban – She had the power to change herself into any form she desired. She could kill anyone by simply raising her hand. However, if she wanted to heal those whom she had made ill by her charms, she could do so without any difficulty. It was also said of her that she could destroy a house by merely saying that she would do so. Mentioned by Juan de Plasencia in "Customs of the Tagalogs" (1589) as a type of witch or class of priest. Among the peasants of the province of Bulacan, Hokloban was a wise old man, almost a magician, who was consulted, and who came to an extremely advanced age, thus being a kind of Methuselah of the Tagalogs. The phrase "matandang Hokloban" (old Hokloban) that applies to the long-lived is still very common.
Priestly agents of the environmental gods:
Silagan – Whose duty was to tempt people and to eat the liver of all those who wear white clothes during mourning and take their souls down to the depth of Kasanaan. Had a sister named Mananangal. Mentioned by Juan de Plasencia in "Customs of the Tagalogs" (1589) as a type of witch or class of priest.
Mananangal – Could be seen walking along dark trails and lonely paths without her head, hands or feet, because her work was to frighten people to death. Mentioned by Juan de Plasencia in "Customs of the Tagalogs" (1589) as a type of witch or class of priest.
Asuan – Who fly at night, murder men, eat their flesh and drink their blood. He has four brothers: Mangagayuma, Sunat, Pangatahuyan, Bayugin. Mentioned by Juan de Plasencia in "Customs of the Tagalogs" (1589) as a type of witch or class of priest.
Mangagayuma – Specialized in charms which, when used by lovers, had the power to infused the heart with love. Mentioned by Juan de Plasencia in "Customs of the Tagalogs" (1589) as a type of witch or class of priest.
Sunat – A well-known priest. Brother of Asuan. Mentioned by Juan de Plasencia in "Customs of the Tagalogs" (1589) as a type of witch or class of priest. According to Plasencia, a sonat is a high priest/priestess equivalent of that of a Bishop. In classical Tagalog, sonat also signified circumcision, it alluded to the ritual of circumcision of Filipino girls upon coming of age by the chief priestess. In suppressing the priestesses, the missionaries unwittingly made one of their greatest contributions to the welfare of Filipino women: the abolition of what is now known as "female genital mutilation" which, unfortunately, still survives in other developing countries.
Pangatahuyan – a soothsayer. Mentioned by Juan de Plasencia in "Customs of the Tagalogs" (1589) as a type of witch or class of priest.
Bayuguin – Whose work was to tempt women into a life of shame (prostitution). Mentioned by Juan de Plasencia in "Customs of the Tagalogs" (1589) as a type of witch or class of priest. Bayoguin (Bayogin) or Bayog are transgender and transvestite priests or shaman of the indigenous religion of the ancient Tagalogs.

Anting-anting pantheon 

Infinito Dios - The highest god and the oldest being from whom everything emanated. The virtue (Birtud/Galing) residing in and empowering the anting-anting and agimat (amulets and talismans). He is also referred to as Nuno (Ancient One, earth deity), Animasola (Lonely Soul, air deity), Waksim (As water deity), and Atardar (His warrior or protective aspect). He is identified to Bathala Maykapal.
Infinita Dios - The female aspect of the Divine. She is said to be the first emanation of the Infinito Dios who sprang forth from his mind when he decided to have someone help him in his task of creation.  She is also referred to as Maria (which stands for: Maris, Amantisimo, Rexsum, Imperator, Altisima), Gumamela Celis (Flower of Heaven), Rosa Mundi (Flower of the World), and Dios Ina (God the Mother); she is also identified with Inang Pilipinas (Mother Philippines) or Inang Bayan (Motherland) similar to Ibu Pertiwi of Indonesia.
The first two elders (nuno) who reside in the two corners of the Earth and are the guardians of the Sun and the Moon:
UPH MADAC - She is the first spirit of the twenty-four Ancianos, except for guarding the first hour after midnight. She designed the Sun in accordance with the task given to her by the Infinito Dios. She made many designs and presented them to her companions and to the Lord, and they chose and all agreed on the shape or appearance of the sun which gives light to the world from then until now and into the future.
ABO NATAC - He is the second spirit, who designed the Moon which gives us light during the night. He did the same, many were also created and these were presented to his companions and to the Infinito Dios, and they agreed on the shape of the moon that is present today.
The following six spirits do not receive any other office. What they did was just wander out into the world, and be God's watchmen:
ELIM – The watchman from 3 a.m. to 3:59 AM.
BORIM – The watchman from 4:00 AM to 4:59 AM.
MORIM – The watchman from 5:00 AM to 5:59 AM.
BICAIRIM – The watchman from 6:00 AM to 6:59 AM.
PERSALUTIM - The watchman from 7:00 AM to 7:59 AM.
MITIM - The watchman from 8:00 AM to 8:59 AM.
The Siete Arkanghelis:
AMALEY - He is the president and first minister of the archangel warriors. He is San Miguel Arcanghel, on his shoulders rests the fight against the wicked to have security on earth and in heaven. San Miguel is assigned as the watchman from 9:00 AM to 9:59 AM on each day, he is also the watchman on the first day of each week, which is Sunday, so he is the one to call on these days to avoid any disasters or events that do not occur. He is also the spirit messenger and messenger of the Infinito Dios throughout the heavens.
ALPACOR – He is the one made secretary by the Siete Arkanghelis of the whole universe, he is San Gabriel who is the recorder of all the hidden wonders in the whole universe and galaxy. San Gabriel is the watchman from 10:00 AM to 10:59 AM of each day, He is also the watchman every Monday, therefore it is good to call him on this day to be saved from all disasters .
AMACOR - He is the prince of the angelic justice and also the giver of heavenly grace for which he is also the Butler of the Infinito Dios. This angel is well known by the name San Rafael, he is the watchman at 11:00 AM of each day and of Tuesdays. He is the one to be called on these days for salvation from calamities.
APALCO - He is the angel who was made Justicia mayor in heaven. Chief Ruler of heavenly things and recommender to God of the punishment to be inflicted, he is also the giver of wisdom to be used by the soul and earthly body of man. This angel is identified as San Uriel who is assigned to watch at 12 noon and he is also the watchman on Wednesdays, so he must be called on this day to be saved from any disaster.
ALCO - This is the spirit that offers or prays to God of any good work of man, he is also the receiver and informer of human needs, regarding God. This angel is San Seatiel who is the watchman on Thursdays and the time of the first hour of the afternoon of each day, so he should be the one to be called on these days:
ARACO - This is the spirit who was made the keeper of treasures and graces. He holds the key to giving the riches and glory of God. This angel is San Judiel, the benefactor and giver of God's mercy. He is also the assigned watchman on Fridays, so he should be the one to be called on these days.
AZARAGUE - This is the guardian spirit of Heaven and Earth, and he is the helper and protector of all spirits under the Infinito Dios. He is San Baraquiel the watchman at 3 pm of each day and is also assigned as the watchman of every Saturdays, so he is the one to be called on these days. San Baraquiel is the last of the Seven Archangels to be known as the seven warriors of God the Father.
LUXBEL – He is the youngest of the 16 spirits first created by the Infinito Dios. His name means "Light of Heaven" because he is the closest to God. When God began his creation, he was baptized with the name BECCA, but he disobeyed the Infinito Dios so he renamed him LUXQUER or LUCIFER. The history of Luxbel can be found in a book entitled DIEZ MUNDOS (Ten Planets). In this book you will find various types of illicit wisdom such as hexes (kulam), glamour (malik mata), philters (gayuma) and many more. Anyone is discouraged to have a copy of this book because it is the cause of unforgivable sin to the Lord.
The following five spirits were not baptized and did not accept the calling. When the Lord Jesus Christ was currently hanging on the cross, they came to be baptized, but it did not happen because at that time our Lord Jesus breathed his last. They are:
ISTAC - The watchman from 5:00 PM to 5:59 PM.
INATAC - The watchman from 6:00 PM to 6:59 PM.
ISLALAO - The watchman from 7:00 PM to 7:59 PM.
TARTARAO - The watchman from 8:00 PM to 8:59 PM.
SARAPAO - The watchman from 9:00 PM to 9:59 PM.
The last three are the Santisima Trinidad, to whom the Infinito Dios gave authority to create the world and its inhabitants.:
MAGUGAB - This spirit presents himself as Dios Ama (God the Father), who some say is the first person of the Santisima Trinidad. But as Dios Ama, he is not the Infinito Dios, but only given him the right and duty to identify himself as God the Father. He was given the design of the world and all its contents such as the various types of flying creatures in the air or those crawling on the ground, especially man. He is the watchman from 9:00 PM to 9:59 PM.
MARIAGUB - This spirit is the second person in the Santisima Trinidad, he has the fullness of Dios Anak (God the Son) and the power to fulfill the mysteries wrought by the Lord Jesus Christ. He is the spirit who incarnates in order to save those who receive and believe in him. This spirit is the one who, in every age, enters the body of the people commanded by God, which was then called the "Lamb of God." He is the watchman from 10:00 PM to 10:59 PM.
MAGUB - This is the third person of the Santisima Trinidad as the Espiritu Santo (Holy Spirit), he is the one who acts to accomplish the thing that must happen in the present. Through his power the promises of the Infinito Dios to the People are formed and fulfilled. He is watchman from 11:00 PM to midnight or 12: 00MN.

other mythological figures 

Bernardo Carpio – The Hispanized avatar of the gigantic underworld crocodile that cause earthquake in pre-colonial Tagalog mythology, and of Palangíyi the mythical King of the Tagalog people. Legend has it that the Tagalogs have a giant king—a messianic figure—named Bernardo Carpio, squeezed between two mountains or two great rocks in the Mountains of Montalban, and who causes earthquakes whenever he tries to free himself. Once the last link on the chains binding him is broken, the enslavement and oppression of his people will be replaced with freedom and happiness. Filipino revolutionary heroes Jose Rizal and Andres Bonifacio are said to have paid homage to the Bernardo Carpio legend – the former by making a pilgrimage to Montalban, and the latter making the caves of Montalban the secret meeting place for the Katipunan movement.
Maria Makiling – The diwata of Mt. Makiling.
Palangíyi (from Malay Palángi = rainbow) – The mythical king of the Tagalog people.
Balitóc (Balitók = gold) – An archetypal witch (manggagaway) of the ancient Tagalogs. Probably the spirit of a famous priestess or a famous witch, perhaps legendary, e.g. Si Balitók ang gumáway sa bátang yarí = It is Balitok who has bewitched the child [SB 1613: 284].
Primordial Kite – caused the sky and the sea to war, which resulted in the sky to throw boulders at the sea, creating islands; built a nest on an island and left the sky and sea in peace
Unnamed God – the god of vices mentioned as a rival of Bathala
Sidapa – god of war who settles disputes among mortals. He also appeared in the Tagalog tale "Why the Cock Crows at Dawn" in Damiana Eugenio's The Myths where said deity is portrayed as a war god who turns a servant into a rooster after failing to wake him early in the morning many times. This tale seems to be derived from the story of Alectryon, a youth whom the war god Ares, placed as a guardian at the door when he visited Aphrodite. The youth, however, fell asleep, and their lovemaking was discovered by Helios (sun). As punishment Alectryon was changed into a rooster, which since then unceasingly announces the arrival of the sun.
Amansinaya – goddess of fishermen
Amihan – a primordial deity who intervened when Bathala and Amansinaya were waging a war; a gentle wind deity, daughter of Bathala, who plays during half of the year, as playing together with her brother, Habagat, will be too much for the world to handle
Habagat – an active wind deity, son of Bathala, who plays during half of the year, as playing together with his sister, Amihan, will be too much for the world to handle
Sinukan – tasked her lover Bayani to complete a bridge
Bayani – lover of Sinukan who failed to complete a bridge; engulfed by a stream caused by the wrath of Sinukan
Ulilangkalulua – a giant snake that could fly; enemy of Bathala, who was killed during their combat
Galangkalulua – winged god who loves to travel; Bathala's companion who perished due to an illness, where his head was buried in Ulilangkalulua's grave, giving birth to the first coconut tree, which was used by Bathala to create the first humans
Bighari – the flower-loving goddess of the rainbow; a daughter of Bathala
Liwayway – the goddess of dawn; a daughter of Bathala
Tag-ani – the god of harvest; a son of Bathala
Kidlat – the god of lightning; a son of Bathala
Hangin – the god of wind; a son of Bathala
Bulan-hari – one of the deities sent by Bathala to aid the people of Pinak; can command rain to fall; married to Bitu-in
Bitu-in – one of the deities sent by Bathala to aid the people of Pinak
Alitaptap – daughter of Bulan-hari and Bitu-in; has a star on her forehead, which was struck by Bulan-hari, resulting to her death; her struck star became the fireflies
Sawa – a deity who assumed the form of a giant snake when he appeared to a priestess in a cave-temple
Rajo – a giant who stole the formula for creating wine from the gods; tattled by the night watchman who is the moon; his conflict with the moon became the lunar eclipse
Unnamed Moon God -  the night watchman who tattled on Rajo's theft, leading to an eclipse
Nuno – the owner of the mountain of Taal, who disallowed human agriculture at Taal's summit
Hari sa Bukid – a king who disallowed the people from planting at the summit of his kingdom's mountain; unless his people showed their industry and hard work, he remains smoking tobacco in the center of the earth
Great Serpent of Pasig – a giant serpent who created the Pasig river after merchants wished to the deity; in exchange for the Pasig's creation, the souls of the merchants would be owned by the serpent
Golden Calf of Banahaw – an enormous golden calf who serve as guardian of Mount Banahaw
Doce Pares – the twelve brave young men who embarked on a quest to retrieve the Golden Calf of Banahaw, headed by the culture-hero Rizal; said to return to the people as giants, together with the Golden Calf, to aid their people in war
Rizal – a culture-hero who led the quest to retrieve the Golden Calf of Banahaw; traditions state that once a world war breaks, he and the Doce Pares will come down from the mountain with the Golden Calf to aid his people in their struggle; another versions states he will aid the people, arriving through a ship
Pablo Maralit – an epic hero who became the ruler of Lipa; has various powers and amulets
Catalina – wife of Pablo Maralit
Balo-na – a wise old woman who foresaw the arrival of the warriors of La-ut that would conquer and ransack the land of Pinak
Dana – a princess who revered the sun god through dances at the Rock of Bathala; impregnated by the sun god and banished from the kingdom, causing the flowers of the rivers to wither; she was later asked to return and continue her sun worship
Loku – a ruler from Quiapo who started to believe in a foreign god; when his people were attacked by foreigners, he was defeated as he could not ask the help of the anitos

Tau-buid Mangyan (Batangan)

Immortals

Rawtit: the ancient and gigantic matriarch who wields a huge knife, wears a lycra, and has magical power to leap miles in one bound; she brings peace to the forest and all its inhabitants
Quadruple Deities: the four childless naked deities, composed of two gods who come from the sun and two goddesses who come from the upper part of the river; summoned using the paragayan or diolang plates

Buhid Mangyan

Immortals

Sayum-ay and Manggat: the ancestral ancient couple who named all trees, animals, lakes, rocks, and spirits
Labang: evil spirits which manifests in animal forms whose bites are fatal, as the bite marks on humans can become channels for bad spirits
Lahi: spirits which are potential allies and protectors against the Labang
Afo Daga: owner of the earth; can cast earthquakes, typhoons, and disease outbreaks when mankind defies the moral codes; appeased though the igluhodan ritual
Afo Fungsu: owner of mountain peaks
Afo Sapa: owner of rivers
Falad: souls of the dead
Malawan: spirits that live in the springs in the deep forest
Taw Gubat: jungle men who live deep in the forest
Bulaw: those who live in mountain peaks; depicted as shooting stars because they fly from one peak to another and lights its way with a torch made from human bone

Mortals

Bulang: a man who got stuck underwater during a torrential rain, resulting to his body become a rock called Bato Bulang; his rock serves as a stopper to a hole beneath it at the Binagaw river, where if it is to be removed, the whole area will be submerged in water

Hanunoo Mangyan

Immortals

Mahal na Makaako: the supreme deity who gave life to all human beings merely by gazing at them
Binayo: owner of a garden where all spirits rest
Binayi: a sacred female spirit who is the caretaker of the Kalag Paray; married to Balingabong
Balungabong: spirit who is aided by 12 fierce dogs; erring souls are chased by these dogs and are eventually drowned in a cauldron of boiling water; married to Binayi
Kalag Paray: rice spirits; appeased to ensure a bountiful harvest
Labang: evil spirits who can take the form of animals and humans
Apu Dandum: spirit living in the water
Apu Daga: spirit living in the soil
Daniw: spirit residing in the stone cared for by the healers

Mortals

Anay and Apog: the only two humans who survived the great flood which killed every other human; lived on top of Mount Naapog
Inabay: wife of Amalahi; met a ghoul, who she requested betel nuts to chew on, as per custom; later turned into a ghoul due to the ghoul's betel nuts
Amalahi: husband of Inabay; killed by his wife, who had turned into a ghoul
Daga-daga: eldest child of Inabay and Amalahi; sister of Palyos; called on the help of the Timawa to escape from her mother, and took care of her child brother in the forest
Palyos: younger child of Ibanay and Amalahi; brother of Daga-daga; befriended a wild chicken who he became friends with until he became tall; eventually, his friend chicken left the world of the living, leaving on its two wings, which when Palyos planted, sprouted and fruited rice, clothing, beads, and many others, which he and his sister shared with others
Timawa: the elves who aided the child Daga-daga and her small brother Palyos to escape from their mother, Inabay, who had turned into a ghoul
Amalahi: a grinning man who tricked the giant Amamangan and his family, which led to their death
Amamangan: a giant whose entire family were tricked by Amalahi, leading to death
Daldali: the fast one, who is always in a hurry, which usually results into deplorable things; cousin of Malway-malway
Malway-malway: the slow one, whose acts are normal and proper; cousin of Daldali
Monkey and Crocodile: two characters where Monkey always outwits
Juan Pusong: a trickster character

Bicolano

Immortals

Gugurang: the supreme god; causes the pit of Mayon volcano to rumble when he is displeased; cut Mt. Malinao in hald with a thunderbolt; the god of good
Asuang: brother of Gugurang; an evil god who wanted Gugurang's fire, and gathered evil spirits and advisers to cause immortality and crime to reign; vanquished by Gugurang but his influence still lingers
Assistants of Gugurang
Linti: controls lightning
Dalodog: controls thunder
Unnamed Giant: supports the world; movement from his index finger causes a small earthquake, while movement from his third finger causes strong ones; if he moves his whole body, the earth will be destroyed
Languiton: the god of the sky
Tubigan: the god of the water
Dagat: goddess of the sea
Paros: god of the wind; married to Dagat
Daga: son of Dagat and Paros; inherited his father'control of the wind; instigated an unsuccessfully rebellion against his grandfather, Languit, and died; his body became the earth
Adlao: son of Dagat and Paros; joined Daga's rebellion and died; his body became the sun; in another myth, he was alive and during a battle, he cut one of Bulan's arm and hit Bulan's eyes, where the arm was flattened and became the earth, while Bulan's tears became the rivers and seas
Bulan: son of Dagat and Paros; joined Daga's rebellion and died; his body became the moon; in another myth, he was alive and from his cut arm, the earth was established, and from his tears, the rivers and seas were established
Bitoon: daughter of Dagat and Paros; accidentally killed by Languit during a rage against his grandsons' rebellion; her shattered body became the stars
Unnamed God: a sun god who fell in love with the mortal, Rosa; refused to light the world until his father consented to their marriage; he afterwards visited Rosa, but forgetting to remove his powers over fire, he accidentally burned Rosa's whole village until nothing but hot springs remained
Magindang: the god of fishing who leads fishermen in getting a good fish catch through sounds and signs
Okot: the forest god whose whistle would lead hunters to their prey
Bakunawa: a serpent that seeks to swallow the moon
Haliya: the goddess of the moon
Apolaki: a mountain monster
Batala: a good god who battled against Kalaon
Kalaon: an evil god of destruction
Son of Kalaon: son of Kalaon who defied his evil father's wishes
Onos: freed the great flood that changed the land's features
Oryol: a wily serpent who appeared as a beautiful maiden with a seductive voice; admired the hero Handyong's bravery and gallantry, leading her to aid the hero in clearing the region of beasts until peace came into the land

Mortals

Baltog: the hero who slew the giant wild boar Tandayag
Handyong: the hero who cleared the land of beasts with the aid of Oryol; crafted the people's first laws, which created a period for a variety of human inventions
Bantong: the hero who single-handedly slew the half-man half-beast Rabot
Dinahong: the first potter; a pygmy who taught the people how to cook and make pottery
Ginantong: made the first plow, harrow, and other farming tools
Hablom: the inventor of the first weaving loom and bobbins
Kimantong: the first person to fashion the rudder called timon, the sail called layag, the plow called arado, the harrow called surod, the ganta and other measures, the roller, the yoke, the bolo, and the hoe
Sural: the first person to have thought of a syllabry; carved the first writing on a white rock-slab from Libong
Gapon: polished the rock-slab where the first writing was on
Takay: a lovely maiden who drowned during the great flood; transformed into the water hyacinth in Lake Bato
Rosa: a sun god's lover, who perished after the sun god accidentally burned her entire village
Malinay: a fearless girl who explored the forests and caves filled with spirits; known in the tale of the origin of bananas

Waray

Immortals

Makapatag-Malaon: the supreme deity with both male and female aspect; the male aspect is Makapatag, the leveler who is fearful and destructive, while the female aspect is Malaon, the ancient understanding goddess
Badadum: a guide of the dead; gathers the souls of the newly dead to meet their relatives at the mouth of a river in the lower world
Hamorawan Lady: the deity of the Hamorawan spring in Borongan, who blesses the waters with healing properties
Berbinota: the beautiful goddess who rules the island of Biri, whose formations were made during the battle of the gods
Maka-andog: an epic giant-hero who was friends with the sea spirits and controlled wildlife and fish; first inhabitant and ruler of Samar who lived for five centuries; later immortalized as a deity of fishing
Rizal: a culture-hero who is prophesied to someday return to aid his people in their struggle

Mortals

Igsabod: one of the 10–11 giant siblings of Maka-andog; friends with the sea spirits
Paula Tomaribo: giant wife and, in some tales, the sibling of Maka-andog; in another tale, she was of Moro origin
Banogbarigos: brother of Maka-andog; became the first aswang
Pagsabihon: one who punishes those who speak of him
Delbora: the one who kaingin farmers offer food; wife of Delalaman
Sanghid: wove cloth on a gold loom with supernatural speed; has the power to move back the sun
Mother of Maka-andog: a gigantic being whose head alone is as large as a hill; lived in Mt. Hurao
Father of Maka-andog: lived in Mt. Hurao in the middle of Samar; more powerful than his sons, including Maka-andog
Tigalhong: brother of Maka-andog; first inhabitant of Leyte
Delalaman: a giant who defeated a priest in a challenge; remained faithful to the old faith, and was never baptised, just like Maka-andog and the other ancestors
Dawisan: one of 9–12 children of Maka-andog who inherited his father's strength and magic
Yugang: a wife of Maka-andog associated with the gold loom

Eskaya

Immortals

Ai Suno: the supreme child deity also called Salvador Suno; later conflated with the Child Jesus due to Christian influence
Baroko: the bird who aided in the retrieval of the Lingganay nga Ugis (silver bell), which it dropped at Kamayaan river and can only be retrieved by Ai Suno when he returns on land, free his people from bondage and give them their second bodies; if the bell is retrieved by someones else, a great deluge will occur

Mortals

Pinay: the founder of the Eskaya language and script; in some sources, Datahan, a historical person who founded an Eskaya school, is said to be a reincarnation of Pinay
Tumud Babaylan: custodian of a sacred silver bell who was stolen by a Spanish priest named Prayleng Vicente; retrieved the stolen by through the aid of a bird called Baroko, who flew with the bell
Humabad: a priest-ruler of Opon, known for his treachery of welcoming the foreigner Magellan and conducting a blood compact with him
Umanad: the epic hero and ruler of Cortes who refused to be baptized and subjugated by Magellan; he allied himself with Lapu-Lapu of Mactan and bravely waged war against Humanad upon his return to Bohol, which ended with Humabad's death and a mortally wounded Umanad
Daylinda: wife of Umanad who was baptized by Magellan; was afterwards gently cast away by Umanad; committed ritual suicide due to the death of her husband
Dangko: the ruler of Talibon who refused to be baptized and subjugated by Magellan
Iriwan: an aide provided by Lapu-lapu to Umanad; became a good friend of Umanad; aided Umanad in his battle against Humabad; sailed Umanad's mortally-wounded body to Cortes through the mystical snaking river Abatan-Waji

Bisaya

Immortals

Kaptan: the supreme god and sky god who fought against Magauayan for eons until Manaul intervened; ruler of the skyworld called Kahilwayan; controls the wind and lightning; in some myths, is married to Maguyaen; also referred as Bathala in one myth; also referred as Abba in one chronicle
Maguayan: the god who rules of the waters as his kingdom; father of Lidagat; brother of Kaptan
Messengers of Kaptan
Dalagan: the swiftest winged giant, armed with long spears and sharp swords
Guidala: the bravest winged giant armed with long spears and sharp swords
Sinogo: the handsomest winged giant armed with long spears and sharp swords; best loved by Kaptan but betrayed his master and was imprisoned under the sea
Maguyaen: the goddess of the winds of the sea
Magauayan: fought against Kaptan for eons until Manaul intervened
Manaul: the great bird who dropped great rocks upon the battle of Kaptan and Magauayan, creating islands
Helpers of Manaul
Kanauay
Amihan
Lidagat: the sea married to the wind; daughter of Maguayan
Lihangin: the wind married to the sea; son of Kaptan
Licalibutan: the rock-bodied son of Lidagat and Lihangin; inherited the control of the wind from his father; initiated the revolt against one of his grandfathers, Kaptan; killed by Kaptan's rage; his body became the earth
Liadlao: the gold-bodied son of Lidagat and Lihangin; killed by Kaptan's rage during the great revolt; his body became the sun
Libulan: the copper-bodied son of Lidagat and Lihangin; killed by Kaptan's rage during the great revolt; his body became the moon
Lisuga: the silver-bodied son of Lidagat and Lihangin; accidentally killed by Kaptan's rage during her brothers' revolt; her body fragments became the stars
Adlaw: the sun deity worshiped by the good
Bulan: the moon deity who gives light to sinners and guides them in the night
Bakunawa: the serpent deity who can coil around the world; sought to swallow the seven "Queen" moons, successfully eating the six, where the last is guarded by bamboos
Divities under Kaptan
Makilum-sa-twan: the god of plains and valleys
Makilum-sa-bagidan: the god of fire
Makilum-sa-tubig: the god of the sea
Kasaray-sarayan-sa-silgan: the god of streams
Magdan-durunoon: the god of hidden lakes
Sarangan-sa-bagtiw: the god of storms
Suklang-malaon: the goddess of happy homes
Alunsina: the goddess of the sky
Abyang: another deity under Kaptan
Maka-ako: also called Laon; the creator of the universe
Linok: the god of earthquakes
Makabosog: a deified chieftain who provides food for the hungry
Sidapa: the goddess of death; co-ruler of the middleworld called Kamaritaan, together with Makaptan
Makaptan: the god of sickness; co-ruler of the middleworld called Kamaritaan, together with Sidapa; he is a brother of Magyan and Sumpoy
Deities under Sidapa and Makaptan
Danapolay: the god who supervises the other deities who answer to Sidapa and Makaptan
Tagusirangan
Duwindihan
Dalongdongan
Tagabititlakan-ka-adlaw
Suta
Agta
Tabukuun
Sappia: the goddess of mercy originating from the island of Bohol who empties the milk from her breasts onto weeds, giving the origin of white rice; when milk ran out, blood came out from her breast, giving the origin of red rice
Tan Mulong: guardian of a spirit cave where souls may be imprisoned; has a spirit dog with one mammary gland and two genitals
Pandaque: messenger of Sidapa; sacrifice is offered to the deity so that a soul can be admitted to the skyworld, Kahilwayan, from the lower world, Kasakitan; lives in Kasakitan, despite being a messenger of Sidapa, who lives in the middleworld, Kamaritaan; also referred as Pandagoy
Magyan: carries the souls of the dead to the lower world, Kasakitan, on his boat called balanday; co-ruler of the lower world Kasakitan, together with Sumpoy; he is a brother of Makaptan and Sumpoy
Sumpoy: takes the souls from Magyan's balanday and carries them to a place in Kasakitan called Kanitu-nituhan; co-ruler of the lower world Kasakitan, together with Magyan; he is a brother of Magyan and Makaptan
Sisiburanen: ruler of Kanitu-nituhan, a sub-realm of the lower world, Kasakitan; acts as slaver of the souls of those who cannot and have yet go into the skyworld; feeds the souls to Simuran and Siguinarugan after the souls stay in Kanitu-nituhan for years
Kuruntang
Simuran: one of the two giant guards of the gates of Kanitu-nituhan
Siguinarugan: one of the two giant guards of the gates of Kanitu-nituhan; also referred as Siginarugan and Siginarungan
Other inhabitants of Kasakitan
Abyang Durunuun: the goddess of charms
Saragnayan: the god of darkness who protected his wife, Nagmalitong Yawa Sinagmaling, from all adversaries in Panay mythologies; his source of immortality was inputted on a wild boar, and upon the killing of the boar, he became mortal and was killed by Buyung Baranugon
Pinganun-pinganun: the god of enchanted places
Unmagad Palinti
Sumpay Pako-Pako
Gods of War
Balangaw: the rainbow
Inaginid
Makanduk
Lalahon: the goddess of fire, volcanoes, and the harvest; also referred as Laon
Santonilyo: a deity who brings rain when its image is immersed at sea; deity of the white men, referring to Spanish colonizers
Gunung: a deity of volcanoes
Magbibaya: a deity similar to the god Magbabaya of the Bukidnon
Lumawig: a deity mentioned in the Aginid
Linug: a deity of earthquakes
Cacao: the goddess of Mount Lantoy who sells her products through a golden ship which can flood rivers
Mangao: husband of Cacao
Rizal: a culture-hero who is said to return in favor of his people's struggle for genuine freedom; based on a historical person
Leon Kilat: a hero who is said will return to the people together with Rizal and Bonifacio in Cebu; based on a historical person, Pantaleon Villegas
Buhawi: also called Kano, a hero who will someday return to aid his people in their struggle in Negros; based on the historical person, Ponciano Elopre

Mortals

Sicabay: the first woman
Sicalac: the first man
Libo: the first child and son of Sicabay and Sicalac; was taken south after the defeat of Pandaguan; became the ancestor of a brown-skinned race
Saman: the first daughter and second child of Sicabay and Sicalac; was taken south after the defeat of Pandaguan; became the ancestor of a brown-skinned race
Pandaguan: a younger son of Sicabay and Sicalac; a clever man who invented the fish trap which caught a giant shark; father of Arion; challenged to overpower the gods, and was punished by zapping
Arion: son of Pandaguan who was taken north after the defeat of Pandaguan; became the ancestor of a white-skinned race
Son of Saman and Sicalac: was taken east after the defeat of Pandaguan; became the ancestor of a yellow-skinned race
Lapulapu: a ruler of Mactan who is valorous, strong, and noble, as well as driven and fearless especially in times of armed conflict; in one account, he is also a mangatang (pirate); bested Humabon in politics, trade, and ocean territory in most accounts, while in one account, Humabon managed to overcome Lapulapu; defeated the Spanish forces including Magellan with aid from the forces of nature; a verified historical person
Humabon: a ruler of Sugbo who is cautious and highly respected, but also brave and courageous especially in times of armed conflict; a verified historical person
Sri Lumay Bataugong: the legendary founder of Sugbo who was said to have come from Sumatra
Sri Bantug: a ruler of Sugbo
Binibini Anduki: sister of Sri Lumay
Bulakna: wife of Lapulapu; in other epics, Lapulapu instead has three wives and eleven children
Sawili: son of Lapulapu and Bulakna
Zula: a ruler that Lapulapu had an enmity with due to both ruler's affection towards Bulakna
Datu Mangal: father of Lapulapu in most versions of the story and ruler of Mactan before Lapulapu; in other versions, he is Lapulapu's uncle or friend and right-hand man; has supernatural powers, various amulets of whirlpools and oil, and a flying horse
Matang Mataunas: mother of Lapulapu; in another tale, the mother of Lapulapu is instead named Matang Matana; also called Matang Mantaunas or Bauga
Malingin: daughter of Datu Mangal and sister of Lapulapu
Sri Mohammed: paternal grandfather of Lapulapu in one tale
Sri Lamaraw Dula: brother of Humabon
Bali-Alho: chief of Bo. Maribago; can break pestles with his bare hands; one of the Mactan chieftains loyally allied to Datu Mangal
Tindak-Bukid: chief of Bo. Marigondon; can level a mountain with a kick; one of the Mactan chieftains loyally allied to Datu Mangal
Umindig: chief of Bo. Ibo, a champion wrestler; one of the Mactan chieftains loyally allied to Datu Mangal
Sagpang-Baha: also called Sampong-Baha; can slap back an onrushing flood; one of the Mactan chieftains loyally allied to Datu Mangal
Bugto-Pasan: can snap the sturdiest vines with his hands; one of the Mactan chieftains loyally allied to Datu Mangal
Silyo: a chief who borrowed an amulet from Datu Mangal; he never returned the amulet and was caught by Datu Mangal fleeing; was turned into a stone along with his crew by Datu Mangal through a curse; before turning a stone completely, he also uttered a curse to turn Datu Mangal into stone; another tale tells that Matang Mataunas and Malingin were also turned into stone
Horned Presidente: a presidente of a town who wanted to continue controlling the people so he wished for horns to frighten them; his wish backfired, with the people withdrawing their support, which later led to his death

Ati

Immortals

Magwala: also called Magdili, the supreme spirit
Abog: chief herdsman of wild pigs and deer; the daga or diwata ritual is offered to invite the herdsmen spirits, headed by Abog
Assistants of Abog
Makalisang
Kangil-Iran
Spirits of the Forest: the first-fruits sacrifices of the hunt are offered to them through bits of meat, which would bring good luck to the people
Bakero
Tawo-nga-talonon
Taglugar: also called Tagapuyo; spirits inhabiting certain places

Mortals

Polpulan: father of Marikudo, and chief of Panay before the ascension of his son
Marikudo: the ruler of Panay who welcomed the ten Bornean datus, who settled on the island through discussions with Marikudo and his people; married to Maniuantiuan and recognized by the ten Bornean datus as their ruler
Maniuantiuan: the beautiful and graceful wife of Marikudo and an excellent negotiator; came from a commoner family

Ilonggo (Hiligaynon)

Immortals

Laon: the supreme goddess and creator residing in Mount Kanlaon; governs the harvest, pestilence, and locusts; also referred to as the god Lalaon
Makaako: the creator and the most powerful god
Kaptan: god of the earth
Magyawan: god of the sea
Manunubo: the good spirit of the sea
Sidapa: god who lives in the sacred Mount Madia-as; determines the day of a person's death by marking every newborn's lifespan on a very tall tree on Madya-as
Pandaque: god who is given ritual offerings so that a soul of the deceased will not be taken by the gods responsible for torment in the afterlife
Gods of Torment
Simuran
Siginarugan
Bulalakaw: god who lives in the sacred Mount Madia-as; malevolent deity in the form of a bird with a flaming tail
Mama Guayen: a god that carries the souls of the dead in a boat to the ends of the earth; also called Maguayen
Sumpoy: god who guides the soul toward a very high mountain
Sisiburanen: the god who rules the mountain where Sumpoy drops off the souls of the dead
Mangalos: the spirits who eat the insides of children; takes away young lives
Hangin: the spirits of the death wind; takes the life of the elderly
Sitaho: also called Sibo Malabag; the god of the early migrants from Borneo
Cabus-Cabus: deified shaman
Dangse: deified shaman
Estrella Bangotbanwa: deified shaman from the 19th century
Gods of War
Balangaw: the rainbow
Inaginid
Makanduk
Canla and Ona: the couple hidden under a clod of earth thrown down by the god Lalaon as punishment to the people who showed malice towards the couple; said to go forth onto the world only after the people become good and envy in the world disappear
Hari-sa-Boqued: an emissary of Canla and Ona; Mount Canlaon is said to burst whenever word has been sent from Canla and Ona to Hair-sa-Baqued, asking if the people have become good and envy is no longer in this world; in other versions, he is also a king of a prosperous kingdom, where his followers are humans, but in one case, he also has loyal dwarfs as followers; disallowed the people from planting tobacco near the summit, but was disobeyed, resulting in an eruption

Mortals

Polpulan: father of Marikudo, and chief of Panay before the ascension of his son
Marikudo: the ruler of Panay who welcomed the ten Bornean datus, who settled on the island through discussions with Marikudo and his people; married to Maniuantiuan and recognized by the ten Bornean datus as their ruler
Maniuantiuan: the beautiful and graceful wife of Marikudo who negotiated with Pinampang; came from a commoner family
Mambusay: son of Marikudo who first spoke with the ten Bornean datus and hear their plea
Makatunao: a tyrant ruler whose actions forced the ten Bornean datus to flee to Panay
Puti: the leader of the ten Bornean datus who fled to Panay; returned to Borneo and fought Makatunao
Pinampang: wife of Puti who negotiated with Maniusntiuan
Lumbay: one of the ten Bornean datus
Bankaya: one of the ten Bornean datus; settled at Aklan
Sumakuel: one of the ten Bornean datus; settled at Hamtik
Damangsil: one of the ten Bornean datus
Dalugdog: one of the ten Bornean datus
Paiburong: one of the ten Bornean datus; settled at Irong-Irong
Padohinog: one of the ten Bornean datus
Dumocsol: one of the ten Bornean datus
Kalengsusu: one of the ten Bornean datus
Horned Presidente: a presidente of a town who yearned to have more power to control the people; he wished for horns to frighten his constituents, which instead led to the people withdrawing their support; died while still wanting to keep his power

Capiznon

Immortals

Laon: the supreme deity; a goddess said to reside in the mountain at the neighboring island of Negros
Bulalakaw: a bird god who looks like a peacock and can cause illnesses; lives in Mount Madja-as
Mediators to the Gods
Bangutbanwa: ensures good harvests and an orderly universe
Mangindalon: intercedes for sick persons; punishes enemies
Soliran: one of two performers of the marriage ceremonies
Solian: one of two performers of the marriage ceremonies
Manunubo: the good spirit of the sea
Tungkung Langit: the god of the sky who brings famine, drought, storms, and floods
Lulid-Batang: the god of the earth, responsible for earthquakes and volcanic eruptions
Linting Habughabug: the god of lightning, whose look kills people and who shouts in anger
Launsina: the goddess of the sun, moon, stars, and seas, and the most beloved because people seek forgiveness from her
Burigadang Pada Sinaklang Bulawan: the goddess of greed to whom people pray when they want to get rich
Saragnayan: the god of darkness who has the power to replace brightness with darkness
Lubay-lubyuk Hanginun si Mahuyuk-huyukun: the goddess of the evening breeze; cools people, especially during the summer
Suklang Malayun: the guardian of happy homes
Maklilum-sa-twan: the god of the plains and valleys.
Agurang: the good spirit who fought against Asuwang
Asuwang: the malevolent spirit who fought against Asuwang

Aklanon

Immortals

Gamhanan: the supreme deity and giver of life, security, and livelihood; lives with many other gods in Mount Daeogdog, where he gives life and punishes errant mortals; used to have a loyal deer-like pet and messenger called Panigotlo, which bleated as a sign of abundance to mortals or foretells floods and despairs to alert the people
Bululakaw: lived in the island's sacred mountain called Madya-as
Laon: a chief goddess
Mediators to the Gods
Bangutbanwa: deity who is prayed to for a good harvests and an orderly universe
Mangindalon: intercedes for sick persons and punishes enemies
Soliran: performs marriage ceremonies
Solian: performs marriage ceremonies
Manunubo: the good spirit of the sea

Mortals

Damhanan: the hunter who killed Panigotlo, the sacred deer-like pet of Gamhanan
Daeogdog: a man with violent temper whose name means thunder; married to Mabuot; wanted to force a marriage between his daughter Agahon and a man named Maeopig
Mabuot: a woman who was kind and gentle, married to Daeogdog; tried to prevent the marriage of Agahon with the hot-tempered Maeopig
Agahon: daughter of Daeogdog and Mabuot; said to be as lovely as the dawn; was to be married to Maeopig even though she rejected the proposal; killed herself before the marriage; from her burial, grew the mango tree
Maeopig: suitor of Agahon; had an uncontrollable anger and was chosen by Daeogdog to marry his daughter

Karay-a

Immortals

Maka-ako: the supreme deity residing on the uppermost level of the cosmic universe's seven layers
Alunsina: the mother goddess of the Hinilawod epic heroes; aided in the battle against Saragnayon
Laonsina: a sky goddess and grandmother of Nagmalitung Yawa
Unnamed Sky God: a sky god who prevented Balanakon from traveling to Labaw Donggon's territory
Tagna-an: the creator god and a busalian shaman; the most powerful and versatile of all ma-aram shamans
Hugna-an: the first man; a ma-aram shaman and child of Tagna-an
Humihinahon: the first woman; a ma-aram shaman and child of Tagna-an
Kapapu-an: the pantheon of ancestral spirits from whom the supernatural powers of shamans originated from; their aid enables specific types of shamans to gush water from rocks, leap far distances, create oil shields, become invisible, or pass through solid matter
Papu Estrella Bangotbanwa: a deified shaman who controlled the forces of nature
Sidapa: god who establishes a person's lifespan through a very tall tree on Mount Madia-as
Pandaque: god who allows the souls of the dead to enter Mount Madya-as, the home of the dead, if a proper mag-anito ritual is held
Simuran: a god who takes the souls to the lower regions
Siginarugan: a god who takes the souls to the lower regions
Bangle: carries the non-liquefied soul across the water; the way he carries the soul differs depending on the soul's answers to his questions
Bagubu: deity of the stream which follows after the crossing with Bangle

Mortals

Labaw Donggon: an epic hero who journeyed to many lands
Gimbitinan: a wife of Labaw Donggon; mother of the hero Asu Mangga
Anggoy Doronoon: a wife of Labaw Donggon; mother of the hero Buyung Baranugun
Yawa Sinagmaling: the wife of the lord, Saragnayon; Labaw Donggon fell in love with her, leading to the battle between Labaw Donggon and Saragnayon
Saragnayon: husband of Yawa Sinagmaling; became a mortal after the wild boar which safeguards his immortality was defeated
Asu Mangga: hero son of Gimbitinan and Labaw Donggon; fought Saragnayon for the release of his father
Buyung Baranugun: hero son of Anggoy Doronoon and Labaw Donggon; fought Saragnayon for the release of his father
Humadapnon: an epic hero; brother of Labaw Donggon and husband of Nagmalitung Yawa; aided by an enchanted tree and three messengers birds in the courting of Nagmaliyung Yawa
Nagmalitung Yawa: a powerful binukot who rescued her husband by transforming herself into a man named Buyung Sunmasakay; defeated the thousand army in Tarangban; when her mother Matan-ayon was in old age, a ritual was conducted where Nagmalitung Yawa found out about Humadapnon's promiscuity; Matan-ayon's powers were transferred to her, and she ascended into heaven with the aid of her grandmother Laonsina
Malubay Hanginon: a powerful binukot who captured and imprisoned by Humadapnon; defeated by Nagmalitung Yawa under her male form
Paglambuhan: a warrior who was keeping the Timpara Alimuon sacred boat in his fortress; defeated by Nagmalitung Yawa, Humadapnon, and Dumalapdap
Matan-ayon: mother of Nagmalitung Yawa; thinking that Humadapnon has died, makes Nagmalitung Yawa pregnant to compel to her marriage with the revived Paglambuhan; Humadapnon later kills the couple, but is reunited with the revived Nagmalitung Yawa; in the Sugidanon epic, she married the reluctant Labaw Donggon
Dumalapdap: an epic hero; brother of Labaw Donggon
Tikim Kadlum: an enchanted dog that rouses the ire of the monster Makabagting
Datu Paiburong: owner of Tikim Kadlum
Amburukay: married to Labaw Donggon after she consented her golden pubic hair to be used in Labaw Donggon's kudyapi
Pahagunon: an underworld being who abducts one of Labaw Donggon's wife, Ayon
Ayon: abducted by Pahagunon after Labaw Donggon transformed into a sea turtle
Giant Crab Master: a master who has a giant crab follower, who aids in the abduction of one of Labaw Donggon's wives; his loyal crab can transform into an island with betel-nut trees
Sanagnayan: a being whose life-force is in an egg in a lion's heart; the sister of Matan-ayon is rescued by Labaw Donggon from Sanagnayan
Balanakon: prevented by the god of the sky from sailing into Labaw Donggon's territory, resulting in a long-drawn battle
Polpulan: father of Marikudo, and chief of Panay before the ascension of his son
Marikudo: the ruler of Panay who welcomed the ten Bornean datus, who settled on the island through discussions with Marikudo and his people; married to Maniuantiuan and recognized by the ten Bornean datus as their ruler
Maniuantiuan: the beautiful and graceful wife of Marikudo who negotiated with Pinampang; came from a commoner family
Mambusay: son of Marikudo who first spoke with the ten Bornean datus and hear their plea
Makatunao: a tyrant ruler whose actions forced the ten Bornean datus to flee to Panay
Puti: the leader of the ten Bornean datus who fled to Panay; returned to Borneo and fought Makatunao
Pinampang: wife of Puti who negotiated with Maniusntiuan
Lumbay: one of the ten Bornean datus
Bankaya: one of the ten Bornean datus; settled at Aklan
Sumakuel: one of the ten Bornean datus; settled at Hamtik
Damangsil: one of the ten Bornean datus
Dalugdog: one of the ten Bornean datus
Paiburong: one of the ten Bornean datus; settled at Irong-Irong
Padohinog: one of the ten Bornean datus
Dumocsol: one of the ten Bornean datus
Kalengsusu: one of the ten Bornean datus

Suludnon (Panay-Bukidnon)

Immortals

Tungkung Langit: the supreme deity and the most powerful male Diwata; he is of unknown origin, coming from somewhere foreign to the other beings of the Sulod pantheon
Assistants of Tungkung Langit
Bangun Bangun: the deity of universal time who regulates cosmic movements
Pahulangkug: the deity who changes the seasons
Ribung Linti: the deity of lightning and thunderstorms
Sumalongsong: the deity of the rivers and seas
Santonil.vo: the deity of good graces
Munsad Burulakaw: the deity who has direct power over men; most respected and feared in the upperworld
Bayi: one of the two primordial giants who appeared out of nowhere and were responsible for the creation of many things; caught the primordial earthworm and gave birth to the wild animals that inhabit the earth
Laki: one of the two primordial giants who appeared out of nowhere and were responsible for the creation of many things
Primordial Earthworm: an ancient earthworm who excreted the earth after it was caught by the primordial giantess, Bayi
The Three Brothers Watching Over the Soul
Mangganghaw: keeps track over man's affairs immediately after marriage; keeps track of pregnancy; he is the first to come to the house of a laboring mother, peeping in the houses to see the child being born, which he then reports to Manglaegas
Manglaegas: enters the house to look for the child to make sure the infant was born alive, then reports to Patag'aes
Patag'aes: awaits until midnight then enters the house to have a conversation with the living infant; if he discovers someone is eavesdropping, he will choke the child to death; their conversation creates the fate of the child, on how long the child wants to live and how the child will eventually die, where the child will always get to choose the answers; once done, Patag'aes takes out his measuring stick, computes the child's life span, and then departs, sealing the child's fate
Bangla'e: ferries the souls across Lim'awaen, a deep lake in the underworld; asks the soul how many spouses it had on earth, where the soul is ferried and talked to differently, depending on the answer and the gender of the soul; the soul cannot lie to Bangla'e, as he will summon the tuma, a body louse and the incarnation of the soul's conscience
Unnamed God: another god that asks questions to the soul
Balagu: guards the bridge of a stream called Himbarawen; asks the same question as Bangla'e to the soul

Cuyonon and Agutaynen

Immortals

Diwata ng Kagubatan: goddess of the forest honored on top of Mount Caimana in Cuyo island
Neguno: the god of the sea that cursed a selfish man by turning him into the first shark

Pala'wan (Palawano)

Immortals

Empuq: the supreme deity, lord, and owner; the creator of all things in the world; also referred as Ampu, the master who wove the world and created several kinds of humanity, hence, he is also called Nagsalad (the weaver); he is a protective watching presence who lives in his abode Andunawan
Diwata: benevolent and protective deity who stays in the median space called Lalangaw; the mediator between humans and the supreme deity
Beljan: the spirits of all beljan (shamans); able to travel to the vertical universe, divided into fourteen different layers, in order to heal the world and to re-establish cosmic balance; also referred to as Balyan
Lenggam: demon-like beings of the forest who act as the caretakers of poisonous and biting animals such as scorpions and snakes; also called Langgam or Saytan, they can be harmful to humans but also benevolent bringers of inspiration and knowledge
Ampu at Paray: the master of rice
Linamin at Barat: the lady-goddess of the monsoon winds
Linamin at Bulag: the lady-goddess of the dry season
Upu Kuyaw: the grandfather god of thunder

Batak

Immortals

Maguimba: the god in the remotests times, lived among the people, having been summoned by a powerful babaylan (shaman); provided all the necessities of life, as well as all cures for illnesses; has the power to bring the dead back to life
Diwata: a benevolent god who provides for the needs of women and men, and gives out rewards for good deeds
Angoro: a deity who lives in Basad, a place beyond this world, where the souls find out whether they will enter the heavens called Lampanag, or be cast into the depths of Basad
Deities of Strength
Siabuanan
Bankakah
Paraen
Buengelen
Baybayen
Batungbayanin: spirit of the mountains
Paglimusan: spirit of the small stones
Balungbunganin: spirit of the almaciga trees
Sulingbunganin: spirit of the big rocks
Esa’: an ancestor whose movements created the landscapes, which he named during a hunting journey with his dogs, who were after wild pigs
Baybay: the goddess and master of rice who originated from Gunay Gunay, the edge of the universe; married to Ungaw
Ungaw: the god and master of bees who originated from Gunay Gunay, the edge of the universe; married to Baybay
Panya’en: mystic entities who control certain wild trees and various animals
Kiudalan: in charge of forest pigs
Napantaran: in charge of forest pigs

Tagbanwa

Immortals

Mangindusa: also referred as Nagabacaban, the highest-ranking deity who lives in Awan-awan, the region beyond the Langit; the god of the heavens and the punisher of crime; also referred as Magindusa, the deity who gives humans their true souls called the kyaraluwa at birth, through the nose of the baby emerging from the vulva; never descends from Awan awan; he is depicted as sitting and swinging back and forth in a bintayawan
Bugawasin: wife of Mangindusa
Dibuwatanin: the messengers of Mangindusa
Tungkuyanin: deity who sits on the edge of this sky-cover with his feet dangling into the universe; also sits looking down at the earth; if he were to raise his head and look up, he would fall into the nothingness
Magrakad: a god found at exactly noontime on the other side of the sun; gives the warmth which sustains life and, when the people are ill, carries away sickness
Bangkay: spirits of the cloud region called Dibuwat; spirits of the people who have been killed by violence, poison, or those who died in giving birth
Bulalakaw: also called Diwata kat Dibuwat; they fly-travel throughout the cloud regions to help the people
Polo: the benevolent god of the sea whose help is invoked during times of illness
Sedumunadoc: the god of the earth, whose favor is sought in order to have a good harvest
Tabiacoud: the god of the underworld in the deep bowels of the earth
Diwata Kat Sidpan: a deity who lives in the western region called Sidpan; controls the rains
Diwata Kat Libatan: a deity who lives in the eastern region called Babatan; controls the rain
Tumangkuyun: wash and keep clean the trunks of the two sacred cardinal trees in Sidpan and Babatan by using the blood of those who have died in epidemics; the blood he uses causes the colors of the sunrise and sunset
Amyan: the hot, dry northeast winds
Diwata katamyan: invoked when the wet period lasts too long and these Amyan hot-dry winds are needed
Salakap: the spirits of epidemic sickness which arrive on earth through the northwest winds; initially were humans who were forced, thru a discriminatory decree or through their comrade's trick, to consume either the feces or flesh of a dead human, which turned them into Salakap
Tumungkuyan: leaders of the Salakap who paint tree trunks the support the sky using the blood of the epidemic-dead
Sumurutun: captain of the outrigger which transports the dead to Kiyabusan
Fuku: deity of smallpox
Lumalayag: warriors who challenge and fight the Salakap
Tandayag: a deity who lives in Kiyabusan; sent by the supreme deity to live with the Salakap in order to prevent them from sailing except during the northeast winds, as per an agreement between the Salakap and the supreme deity
Taliyakud: chief god of the underworld who tends a fire between two tree trunks; asks the souls of the dead questions, where the soul's louse acts as the conscience that answers the questions truthfully; if the soul is wicked, it is pitched and burned, but if it is good, it passes on to a happier place with abundant food
Diwata: general term for deities; they created the first man made from earth and gave him the elements of fire, the flint-like stones, iron, and tinder, as well as rice and most importantly, rice-wine, which humans could use to call the deities and the spirits of their dead

Surigaonon

Immortals

God of Animals: the deity of animals who allowed the creatures to speak but forbade them from dancing; when a king heard of an island filled with dogs, he ordered a captain to get some of them; the captain ordered the dogs which they did, angering the god of animals who struck their ship with lightning, killing the captain and turning the dogs and ship into an island called Tagbayanga, which now protects the town of Pilar from strong winds and waves
Mount Diwata Deities: a group of deities (diwata) at the Diwata Mountains, whose privacy was subjugated by the noise created by the hornbills (kalaw); the oldest among them used her wooden staff and tapped in on the ground three times, which made their home flew up and became the island of Camiguin; a crater was left, which became Lake Mainit
Pikit Octopus: a small octopus at the Pikit river who was raised by the fivider Sario, until grew massive; inflicted illness to anyone who it has stung; when Sario died, the octopus left the river
Rizal: a culture-hero who in the future, will return to aid his people in their struggle

Mortals

Sario: a diviner who raised the giant octopus in the Pikit river

Mamanwa

Immortals

Tahaw: supreme deity who is give prayers of supplications and petitions
True: deity of the forest and herder of hunting animals

Subanon

Immortals

Diwata Magbabaya: the supreme deity and creator of heaven and earth; also referred to as Diwata-sa-Langit, who lives in the sky; also referred as Bathala; can turn anyone into stone through his lightning
Palmot: one of trusted heavenly messenger of the supreme deity; an angel
Tagma-sa-Dagat: the god of the sea
Tagma-sa-Yuta: the god of the earth
Tagma-sa-Manguabungud: the god of the woods
Tagma-sa-uba: the god of the rivers
Tagma-sa-langit: the god who protects the sick
Jobrael: also called Jobraim; son of a human and a supernatural; stayed on earth for a thousand years, and was taken back to heaven by Palmot after he failed to raise the divine kettle provided by the supreme deity

Mortals

Son of Jobrael: was to be taken back to heaven seven years after his father, Jobrael, was called back; retained his earthly status due to a seven-year plan initiated by his wife
Wife of Jobrael's Son: devised the creation of the entire buklog rituals and its instruments, resulting to her husband's permanent residence on earth
Gomotan Raja: an ancient leader who settled at the banks of Lapuyan river
Gomotan Sangira: an ancient leader who settled in Megusan
Palaganding: son of Gomotan Sangira and twin brother of Rainding; a brave and proficient swordsman
Rainding: son of Gomotan Sangira and twin brother of Palaganding; a brave and proficient swordsman
Gomeed: son of Gomotan Sangira; a brave and proficient swordsman
Bulaw: daughter of Gomotan Sangira; a brave and proficient swordswoman
Rajah Humabon: a Subanon who migrated to Cebu and became a ruler there

Manuvu

Immortals

Manama: the supreme deity also referred as Sigalungan, meaning all seeing; created the diwatas to assist him in creation; created the earth from his fingernail scrapings
Assistants in Manama's creation: all were given katusan (precognition and power); their bodies were life fingernails, smooth and shiny and only their joints have skin
Pammaong na Diwata
Paong na Katusan
Panayangan
Tumanud
Anitu
Ogassi: brother of Manama; incorporated abaca strans into the clay that would become humans, causing mankind's mortality

Bukidnon

Immortals

Diwata na Magbabaya: simply referred as Magbabaya; the good supreme deity and supreme planner who looks like a man; created the earth and the first eight elements, namely bronze, gold, coins, rock, clouds, rain, iron, and water; using the elements, he also created the sea, sky, moon, and stars; also known as the pure god who wills all things; one of three deities living in the realm called Banting; holds up the serpent deities Intumbangol so they won't fall off the world; also referred to as Bathala
Dadanhayan ha Sugay: the evil lord from whom permission is asked; depicted as the evil deity with a human body and ten heads that continuously drools sticky saliva, which is the source of all waters; one of the three deities living in the realm called Banting
Agtayabun: the adviser and peace maker deity with a hawk-like head, wings, and a human body; tempers the heads of Diwata na Magbabaya and Dadanhayan ha Sugay whenever the two argue; one of the three deities living in the realm called Banting, where he holds the other two in a suspending fashion, while maintaining the balanace of Banting; the beating of his wings produce the wind
Incantus: six of the seven original figures initially created by the three supreme deities; became guardian spirits and divinities when they were finished by Dadanhayan ha Sugay; they are both good and evil, but they take care of nature and will give its fruits if given respect through offerings; if offended, they can send droughts, flood, pestilence, or sickness
Talagbugta: look after the soil
Ibabagsuk: take care of nature and grow plants
Bulalakaw: guards the water and all the creatures living in it
Mamelig: watch over the forest
Lalawig: watch over the bees and honey
Mamahandi: guards over the material wealth that men acquire
First Human: one of the seven original figures created by the three supreme deities; became the first human when finished by Diwata na Magbabaya; endowed with intelligence, and entrusted with the Haldan ta Paraiso
Magbabaya (general): general term for the gods of the universe living at the points where the world's concavities meet; usually referred simply to the supreme deity named Diwata na Magbabaya
Intumbangol: a pair of serpent deities who support the earth from the underworld; one is male, the other female; their movement causes earthquakes, their breathing causes winds, and their panting causes violent storms
Miyaw-Biyaw: the deity who breathes the makatu (soul) into humans at birth
Andalapit: leads the soul from the banquet in Kumbirahan into the foot of Mount Balatucan, where the gods of the seas are assembled to judge the soul
Mangilala: god of temptation that haunts the seventh tier of the underworld; brother of Magbabaya, who he aided in the creation of humans, although when Mangilala breathed into the figures, humans became tempted to evil things
Assistants of Magbabaya
Domalongdong: god of the north wind
Ognaaling: god of the south wind
Tagaloambung: god of the east wind
Magbaya: god of the west wind
Agents of Magbabaya
Tagumbanwa: guardian of the fields
Ibabasag: goddess of pregnant women
Ipamahandi: goddess of accidents
Pamahandi: protector of carabaos and horses
Tao-sa-sulup: god of material goods
Tigbas: god of good government
Busao: god of calamity
Talagbusao: bloodthirsty god of war
Camiguin: a mountain goddess who lived peacefully until the noisy kalaw disturbed her; sank and established Lake Mainit, and rose to sea, moving westward until she became the island of Camiguin
Python of Pusod Hu Dagat: the gigantic python living at the center of the sea; caused a massive flood when it coiled its body at sea

Mortals

Agyu: subdued the Intumbangol
Tuluyan: son of Agyu, who gave him the source of traditional authority called Takalub, composed of the boar-tusk bracelet Baklaw and the black stick Gilling, which gave its owner Kalaki (talent and power) to settle disputes
Gahemen: a widow who survived the flood caused by the Python of Pusod Hu Dagat
Teheban: son of Gahemen after the great flood caused by the Python of Pusod Hu Dagat
Pabulusen: son of Gahemen and Teheban; his people became keepers of power
A-ayawa-en: son of Gahemen and Teheban; his people became keepers of religious customs
Tataun-en: son of Gahemen and Teheban; his people often experienced hunger
Bala-ol: brother of Mampolompon; survived the great drought and became an ancestor of the Bukidnon
Mampolompon: brother of Bala-ol; survived the great drought and became an ancestor of the Bukidnon
Tibolon: survived the great drought and became an ancestor of the Bukidnon
Managdau: survived the great drought and became an ancestor of the Bukidnon

Higaonon

Immortals

Halangdong Magbabaya: the supreme deity; simply referred as Magbabaya, the creator of all things
Diwata: became a friend of the carpenter, David
Limokan: a pigeon who when cooed at, ensures a bountiful harvest
Ibabasok: the good spirit of the harvest

Mortals

Datu Indulum: formulated the laws of Mt. Sinakungan
David: a carpenter who gained the ability to design and make houses after he buried a shining stone from the body of a huge spider into his muscles

Talaandig

Immortals

Magbabaya: the supreme deity; the sinebugan ritual is offered to the deity for the protection of those who enter the forest
Dadagunan hu Suguy: deity who guards of the lawn of the house
Anilaw ha Sumagda: deity who guards the door
Sinyuda Kahibunan: deity who keeps the hall
Diwata ha Manilib: deity who records the activity of people inside the house
Diwata Pinatanlay: deity who guards the house at the ridge of the roof
Lalawag: deity who safeguards wild pigs	
Mangumanay: deity who safeguards wild chickens	
Mangusal: deity who safeguards the honeybees; the palayag ritual is performed to honor the deity
Bulalakaw: deity who safeguards the creatures in the rivers; the lalayon ritual is offered to the deity

Manobo

Immortals

Tagbusan: the supreme deity who rules over the destinies of all other gods and mortals
Dagau: the goddess of creation living at the world's four pillars; established the world according to the version from Argawan and Hibung rivers; when human blood is spilled upon the face of the earth, she makes the great python wrap itself around the pillars, creating earthquakes
Makalindung: the god of creation who set up the world on iron posts; lives in the center with a python; created the world according to the version from around Talakogan in Agusan valley
Unnamed deities: in a third version of the creation myth, the world is a giant mushroom and unnamed deities are said to shake its core when angered by humans
Ibu: the goddess who rulers over the land of the dead, where under her governance, there are no worries or troubles and souls in the underworld continue to eat, work, and marry
Diwata: a group of divinities that shamans call to for signs of the future
Umli: divinities who assist mortals with help from the Diwata
Pamdiya: divinities who have purview over war; initiate war
Panaiyung: divinities who have purview over madness; force madness upon men
Agkui: divinities who have purview over sexual excess
Tagbayaw: the goddess that incites incest and adultery in mortals
Sugudun: also called Sugujun; the god of hunters and trappers
Apila: the god of wrestling and sports
Kakiadan: the goddess of rice
Taphagan: the goddess of the harvest who guards rice in the granary
Anit: also called Anitan; the guardian of the thunderbolt
Inaiyau: the god of storms
Tagbanua: the god of rain
Umouiri: the god of clouds
Libtakan: the god of sunrise, sunset, and good weather
Yumud: the god of water
Manduyapit: the god who ferries departed souls across the red river before going to the afterworld
Datu Ali (Mampuroc): a hero who fought the Spanish and became a deity; his reincarnation, Mampuroc, is a shaman-hero who is said to one day return to the people to aid them in their struggle; based on a historical person

Mandaya

Immortals

Unnamed Woman: the woman who pressed the earth, creating mountains
Primordial Eel: a great eel whose back holds the earth; its movements cause earthquakes if crabs and small animals annoy it

Mansaka

Immortals

Taganlang: the creator god who has a helper bird named Oribig also called Magbabaya, the creator of mankind
Oribig: the celestial helper bird of Taganlang; flew to the far corner of the universe under the behest of Taganlang to get soil, which became the materials used by Taganlang to create earth

Kalagan

Mortals

Kawlan: an epic hero and baylan (shaman) who defeated the monster Datu Waytiyap; husband of Bodi
Ibang: father of Kawlan; a gifted baylan (shaman)
Salma: mother of Kawlan
Datu Waytiyap: a giant monster who can shapeshift into a human leader; defeated by Kawlan
Father of Bodi: an old man who rescued Kawland from a monster monkey
Bodi: wife of Kawlan
Datu of the East: entered into a pact of equality with the Datu of the West; worked in the morning; allowed the other datu to gain more from harvest season due to the afternoon heat
Datu of the West: entered into a pact of equality with the Datu of the East; worked in the afternoon; requested to have more share from the harvest due to the afternoon heat

Bagobo

Immortals

Pamulak Manobo: supreme deity and creator of the world, including the land, sea, and the first humans; throws water from the sky, causing rain, while his spit are the showers; controls good harvest, rain, wind, life, and death; in some myths, the chief deity is simply referred as the male deity, Diwata
Melu: another name of the supreme deity, who created humans, aided by his brother Fun Tao Tana
Manama: another name of the supreme deity who created the world and human beings
Fun Tao Tana: aided Melu in the creation of humans; put on the noses of humans upside down, which Melu corrected
Assistants of Pamulak Manobo
Tigyama: the god of protection; visited Lumabet, which resulted in the hero's journey
Malaki t’ohu A’wig: the hero who destroyed sickness
Tarabumo: deity for whom the rice ceremony is held
Panayaga: the god of brass casters
Abog: the god of hunters
Tonamaling: a deity who may be benevolent or malevolent
Lumbat: a divinity of the skyworld who became a diwata when the chief deity cut out his intestines; eventually became the greatest of all Diwata
Diwata (general): a class of deities; also a name associated with the chief deity
Salamiwan
Ubnuling
Tiun
Biat’odan
Biakapusad-an-Langit
Kadeyuna
Makali Lunson
Tolus ka balakat: the dweller of the ritual hanger
Unnamed Gods: gods whose fire create smoke that becomes the white clouds, while the sun creates yellow clouds that make the colors of the rainbow
Unnamed Divinities: each realm in the skyrealms are ruled by a lesser divinity
Darago: god of warriors married to Mandarangan
Mandarangan: god of warriors married to Darago; resides at Mount Apo's summit; human sacrifices to him are rewarded with health, valor in war, and success in the pursuit of wealth
Mebuyan: the underworld goddess who governs Banua Mebuyan, a special place reserved for children who died at their mother's breast; she nourishes the souls of dead infants, until they no longer need nursing
Taragomi: the god of crops
Tolus ka Gomanan: the god of smiths
Bait Pandi: the goddess of weavers who taught women weaving
Sky Goddess: the sky herself; debated with Lumabet, until an agreement was reached, so that Lumabet and his people may enter the sky, except for the last man
Lumabet: a hero who guided his people into the sky, where they became immortals
Father of Lumabet: was cut into many pieces many times under Lumabet's order, until he became a small child
Tagalion: son of Lumabet and searched for his father in Lumabet's abode underground; aided by white bees in finding his father in the sky
Eels of Mount Apo: two giant eels, where one went east and arrived at sea, begetting all the eels of the world; the other went west, and remained on land until it died and became the western foothills of Mount Apo
Toglai: one of the two ancestors of mankind; became a spirit after death
Toglibon: one of the two ancestors of mankind; became a spirit after death
Limocan: a venerated omen bird, who warned a chief about the dangers during the rescue of the chief's kidnapped daughter

Mortals

Lakivot: a giant civet who pursued the flowers of gold guarded by the one-eyed ogassi and witches called busaw; turned into a young man after his eyebrows were shaved
Girl Companion of Lakivot: requested Lakivot to bring the flowers of gold, which later resulted into their marriage

Blaan

Immortals

Melu: the creator deity whose teeth are pure gold and whose skin is pure white; created humans with the god Tau Tana
Tau Tana: created humans with the god Melu amidst a great argument; put people's noses upside down, a mistake corrected by Melu; also called Tau Dalom Tana
Tasu Weh: creator of humans in another myth, where humans had male sexual organs on one knee, and female sexual organs on the other
Fiu Weh: the god who created modern humans by separating the sexual organs; also called Fiuwe
Sawe: goddess who joined Melu to live in the world
Diwata: goddess who joined Fiuwe to live in the sky
Baswit: a primordial bird who lived on the first island as small as a hat called Salnaon; by the order of the gods, it brought earth, a fruit of rattan, and fruits of trees to Melu, who used the materials to create the world
Fon Kayoo: spirit of the trees
Fon Eel: spirit of water
Fon Batoo: spirit of rocks and stones
Tau Dalom Tala: spirit who lives in the underworld
Loos Klagan: the most feared deity, uttering his name is considered a curse

Mortals

Adnato: the first man
Adwani: the first woman
Tapi: child of Adnato and Adwani
Lakarol: child of Adnato and Adwani
Descendants of Tapi and Lakarol
Sinudal
Moay
Limbay
Madinda
Sinnamoway
Kamansa
Gilay
Gomayau
Salau
Slayen
Baen
Kanial
Latara

T'boli

Immortals

Bulon La Mogoaw: one of the two supreme deities; married to Kadaw La Sambad; lives in the seventh layer of the universe
Kadaw La Sambad: one of the two supreme deities; married to Bulon La Mogoaw; lives in the seventh layer of the universe
Cumucul: son of the supreme deities; has a cohort of fire, a sword and shield; married to Boi’Kafil
Boi’Kafil: daughter of the supreme deities; married to Cumucul
Bong Libun: daughter of the supreme deities; married to S’fedat; could not bear children
S’fedat: son of the supreme deities; married to Bong Libun; could not bear children; asked Bong Libun to instead kill him, where his body became the land on which plants spout from
D’wata: son of the supreme deities; married to both Sedek We and Hyu We; placed the land-body of S’fedat onto the sea
Sedek We: daughter of the supreme deities; married to D’wata
Hyu We: daughter of the supreme deities; married to D’wata
Blotik: son of the supreme deities; married to S’lel
S’lel: daughter of the supreme deities; married to Blotik
B’lomi: daughter of the supreme deities; married to Mule
Mule: son of the supreme deities; married to B’lomi
Loos K’lagan: son of the supreme deities; married both La Fun and Datu B’noling
La Fun: daughter of the supreme deities; married to Loos K’lagan
Datu B’noling: daughter of the supreme deities; married to Loos K’lagan
Children of D’wata and Hyu We
L’tik
B’langa
Temo Lus
T’dolok
Ginton
L’mugot M’ngay
Fun Bulol: the owner of wild animals
Children of D’wata and Sedek We
Kayung
Slew
S’mbleng
Nagwawang
Nga Hule
S’ntan
Fu: spirits that inhabit and own the natural environment
Fu El: the spirit of water
Fu El Melel: the spirit of the river
D’wata (general): the general term for the gods; guard lives and determine fate and destiny
Fu Dalu: the goddess of the abaca; speak and guide weavers on how to create patterns and designs, which are remembered in dreams
Muhen: a bird god of fate whose song when heard is thought to presage misfortune; any undertaking is immediately abandoned or postponed when one hears the Muhen sing
Glinton: the god of metalwork

Teduray (Tiruray)

Immortals

Tulus: referred as the Great Spirit, who was neither male nor female and created all things, including the forest, those that we see (such as humans), and those that we can't see (such as spirits) from mud; created and re-created humans four times, first due to the non-existence of humans, second due to birthing issues, the third due to Lageay Lengkuos's initiation of the ascending of mankind into the Great Spirit's realm which resulted into the absence of humans on earth, and the last due to another initiation of mankind's ascending to the sky world which made the same effect as the third; another name for Meketefu, but also a general term used to apply to the highest deity in each of the layers of the upper regions
Minaden: creator of mankind, which was made from mud; creator of the earth put at the middle of daylight; provided mankind with their clothes and languages; her house welcomes living women who managed to arrive in the upper most level of the upper worlds
Meketefu: the unapproachable brother of Minaden; also called Tulus, he corrected the sexual organs and noses of mankind; gave one group of people the monkey clothing which can turn anyone into monkeys, while gave another group bows and arrows
Monkey Leader: also called Little Moneky, he is a culture hero who went to Tulus to intercede for his people, which resulted in his group to ascend the upper regions; two non-believer of his group were left on earth, but he returned to give them earth and a piece of iron which extended from earth to sky, which became the source of all iron
Biaku: the magic bird who furnished the clothes and beads initiated by Minaden; when a neighboring people attacked the Teduray to take wealth, Biaku fled
Metiatil: married to the hero Lageay Lengkuos; also referred to as Metiyatil Kenogan
Lageay Lengkuos: the greatest of heroes and a shaman (beliyan) who made the earth and forests; the only one who could pass the magnet stone in the straight between the big and little oceans; inverted the directions where east became west, inverted the path of the sun, and made the water into land and land into water; also known as Lagey Lengkuwos, was impressed by the beauty of the region where the Great Spirit lives, and decided to take up his people there to live with the Great Spirit, leaving earth without humans
Matelegu Ferendam: son of Lageay Lengkuos and Metiatil, although in some tales, he was instead birthed by Metiatil's necklace, Tafay Lalawan, instead
Lageay Seboten: a poor breechcloth-wearing culture hero who carried a basket of camote and followed by his pregnant wife; made a sacred pilgrimage to Tulus, and awaits the arrival of a Teduray who would lead his people
Mo-Sugala: father of Legeay Seboten who did not follow his son; loved to hunt with his dogs, and became a man-eater living in a cave
Saitan: evil spirits brought by foreign priests
Guru: leader of the Bolbol, a group of humans who can change into birds or whose spirits can fly at night to hunt humans
Damangias: a spirit who would test righteous people by playing tricks on them
Male Beliyan (Shamans)
Endilayag Belalà
Endilayag Kerakam
Lagey Bidek Keroon
Lagey Fegefaden
Lagey Lindib Lugatu 
Lagey Titay Beliyan
Omolegu Ferendam
Female Beliyan (Shamans)
Kenogon Enggulon
Bonggo Solò Delemon
Kenogon Sembuyaya
Kenogon Dayafan
Bonggo Matir Atir
Kenogon Enggerayur
Segoyong: guardians of the classes of natural phenomena; punishes humans to do not show respect and steal their wards; many of them specialize in a class, which can be water, trees, grasses, caves behind waterfalls, land caves, snakes, fire, nunuk trees, deers, and pigs; there were also Segoyang of bamboo, rice, and rattan; caretakers of various aspects of nature
Segoyong of Land Caves: take the form of a feared snake known a humanity's grandparent; cannot be killed for he is the twin of the first people who was banished for playfully roughly with his sibling
Segoyong of Pigs: takes its share of butterflies in the forest; feared during night hunts
Segoyong of Deers: can change humans into deers and man-eaters; feared during night hunts
Segoyong of Sickness: sends sickness to humans because in the early years, humans were not nice to him; talking about him is forbidden and if one should refer to him, a special sign of surrender is conducted
Woman at Bonggo: the woman at Bonggo who gathers the spirits at the land of the dead in the sky; keeps the spirit of the body
Woman beyond Bonggo: the woman beyond Bonggo who keeps the spirit of the umbilical cord
Brother of Tulus: lives in the highest abode in the land of the dead, where those who died in battle reside
Maginalao: beings of the upper regions who can aid someone to go up in the upper worlds without dying, where usually a female aids a person first, followed by her brother; they sometimes come to earth to aid the poor and the suffering
Giant of Chasms: the first one to guard the chasms between the layers of the upper regions; a man-eating giant
Spirit of Lightning and Thunder: advises humans about good and bad, to not tease animals, and to respect elders and ancestors
Spirit Who Turns Earth into Water: advises humans about good and bad, to not tease animals, and to respect elders and ancestors
One Who Forces the Truth
One of Oratory
Settlers of the Mountains: each of the eight layers of the upper regions have eight spirits referred as Settlers of the Mountains; they are four men and four women who are appealed to for pity in order to get to the highest ranking spirit in a layer
Spirit of the Stars: a spirit higher in rank than the Settlers of the Mountains
Spirit of the Umbilical Cord: the woman beside the deity Meketefu (Tulus); hardest to get pity from as the people were once unkind to her
Malang Batunan: a giant who had a huge house; keep the souls of any false shamans from passing through the region of the Great Spirit
Major constellation deities: six constellations asked by the hero Lagey Lingkuwus to remain in the sky to aid in the people's farming
Fegeferafad: the leader of the constellations; actual name is Keluguy, the fatherly figure for the cousins Kufukufu, Baka, and Seretar; shaped like a human, the deity has a headcloth and chicken wings on his head, symbolizing courage
Kufukufu: one of the three cousins who view both Fegeferafad and Singkad as their fatherly figures
Baka: one of the three cousins who view both Fegeferafad and Singkad as their fatherly figures
Seretar: one of the three cousins who view both Fegeferafad and Singkad as their fatherly figures
Singkad: spouse of Kenogon; another fatherly figure for the cousins Kufukufu, Baka, and Seretar
Kenogon: spouse of Singkad; has a comb, which is always near Singkad

Mortals

Flood Couple: after the great flood, a Teduray boy and Dulungan girl survived and married; their offspring who took after their father became the Teduray, while those who took after their mother became the Dulungan, who were later absorbed by the Manobo
Mamalu: an ancestor of the Teduray; the elder sibling who went into the mountains to remain with the native faith; brother of Tambunaoway, ancestor of the Maguindanao
Tambunaoway: an ancestor of the Maguindanao; the younger sibling who went remained in the lowlands and welcomed a foreign faith; brother of Mamalu, ancestor of the Teduray
First Humans: the first couple's child died and from the infant's body, sprouted various plants and lime
Pounding Woman: a woman who was pounding rice one day that she hit the sky with her pestle, which shamed the sky, causing it to go higher
Alagasi: giant humans from western lands who eat smaller humans
Tigangan: giants who take corpses, and transform these corpse into whatever they want to eat
Siring: dwarfs of the nunuk trees

Maguindanao

Immortals

Supreme Being: the supreme deity who is far way, and so lesser divinities and spirits hear people's prayers instead; was also later called as Allah by Muslim converts
Malaykat: each person is protected by these angelic beings from illness; they also guide people in work, making humans active, diligent, and good; they do not talk nor borrow a voice from humans, and they don't treat sick persons
Tunung: spirits who live in the sky, water, mountain, or trees; listens to prayers and can converse with humans by borrowing the voice of a medium; protects humans from sickness and crops from pests
Cotabato Healer Monkey: a monkey who lived near a pond outside Cotabato city; it heals those who touch it and those who give it enough offerings
Patakoda: a giant stallion whose presence at the Pulangi river is an omen for an unfortunate event
Datu na Gyadsal: the chief adversary, who was also later called as Satan by Muslim converts; also called as Iblis by Muslim converts; offering are given to this spirit to appease and prevent it from performing calamities
Saitan: possessing spirits
Spirit of the Rainbow: a spirit who may cut the finger of those who use their index finger to point at the rainbow
Jinn: a group of celestial beings
Bantugen: an epic hero-god and the god of forefathers who the masses look up to and trust
Leping: the twin-spirit of an infant
Apo: anestral spirits who take the role of intermediaries who overcome evil spirits
Pagari: also called Inikadowa, the twin-spirit who is sometimes in the form of a crocodile; if a person is possessed by them, the person will attain the gift of healing

Mortals

Tarabusao: a half-man, half-horse giant monster who rules Mindanao and feasted on male human flesh, which caused many to escape into the island of Mantapuli; beheaded by Skander
Skander: the ruler of Mantapuli and an epic hero who went on a quest to slay the monster Tarabusao
Bai Labi Mapanda: the fairest lady of Mantapuli who is married to Skander
Kalanganan Kapre: a good giant who provided the people of Kalanganan I with security, guarding them against bad elements; eventually left Kalanganan when his home near the Pulangi river was cut down due to a surge in human population
Rajah Indarapatra: brother of Rajah Solayman; gave his ring and sword called Jurul Pakal to his brother, who went on a quest to defeat the monsters in Maguindanao; also planted a tree which would only die if Rajah Solayman dies; searched for his brother, who he revived using heaven-sent waters at Mount Gurayn; he afterwards went into his own quest, where he slayed a seven-headed monster; he eventually returned to Mantapoli
Rajah Solayman: brother of Rajah Indarapatra; went on a quest to defeat various monsters; slayed Kurita, Tarabusar, and Pah, but died when Pah's weight crushed him; revived when Rajah Indarapatra poured heaven-sent waters onto his bones, where afterwards, Rajah Solayman returned to Mantapoli
Kurita: an amphibious animal with several limbs and lived on land and sea; haunts Mount Kabalalan, and slayed by Rajah Solayman; sometimes depicted as an octopus
Tarabusar: a humongous human-like creature who lived in Mount Matutum; slayed by Rajah Solayman
Pah: a bird of prey as big as a house and whose wings caused darkness on the ground; lives in Mount Bita and slayed by Rajah Solayman at Mount Gurayn
Monster of Mount Gurayn: a seven-headed monster at Mount Gurayn, who was slayed by Rajah Indarapatra
Wife of Rajah Indarapatra: daughter of a local ruler who hid in a cave due to the number of monsters in Maguindanao; married to Rajah Indarapatra and gave birth to their children; they were entrusted to her father, the local ruler, after Rajah Indarapatra returned to Mantapoli
Tambunaoway: an ancestor of the Maguindanao; the younger sibling who went remained in the lowlands and welcomed a foreign faith; brother of Mamalu, ancestor of the Teduray
Mamalu: an ancestor of the Teduray; the elder sibling who went into the mountains to remain with the native faith; brother of Tambunaoway, ancestor of the Maguindanao

Maranao

Immortals

Tohan: the supreme deity who is perfect, having no defect; can cause and stop earthquakes and pestilence; later also called as Allah by Muslim converts
Sun Deity: divine being depicted in an anthropomorphic form as a flaming young man; angels serve as his charioteers
Moon Deity: divine being depicted in an anthropomorphic form as a beautiful young woman; angels serve as her charioteers
Jinn: beings who live in the atmosphere which serves as a buffer zone between the skyworld and the earth, called Oraonan a Lantoy, known for possessing a garden of flowers and vegetables
Walain sa Letingan: the princess-goddess living in a skyworld region called Magoyeda a Selegen
Papanok sa Aras: children who died prematurely and were transformed into birds of paradise living in the skyworld region called Sorga
Houris: heavenly maidens blessed with eternal beauty and perpetual virginity
Lumpong: a large animal who carries the earth; accompanied by a small shrimp that sometimes claws on the earth-holder from time to time, causing the phenomena of earthquakes
Sakar: a monster in the underworld where disrespectful children are trapped in its belly
Walain Katolosan: the goddess who owns the amulet Sikag a Makaombaw
Tonong: divine spirits who often aid heroes; often lives in nonok trees, seas, lakes, and the sky realm
Apo: benign tornado and waterspout spirits; a classification of tonong; they are the ancestral spirits tasked to kill or drive away evil spirits
Sakit: maligant harmful spirits responsible for diseases; a classification of tonong
Saitan: malignant possessing spirits; a classification of tonong
Inikadowa: the benign spirit double or guardian of a person, who is with the person when the baby is born; a classification of tonong; the placenta is their manifestation
Tolos: a class of tonong who inhabit the sky realms; prayed to, especially in times of battle and protection for quests; referred to as gods
Pinatola’ a Tonong: the ancestor of all unseen benevolent spirits; a tonong who takes the form of a gigantic crocodile at sea, a garuda in air, and a giant on land; a guardian spirit of Diwata Ndaw Gibon
Pinatoli i Kilid: a tonong who takes the form of a gigantic crocodile; the guardian spirit of the king of Bemberan, Diwata Ndaw Gibon; clashed with Ladalad a Madali, grandson of Gibon; later gave valuable information to Madali; during the battle of Madali and Pirimbingan, Madali was aided by Pinatoli i Kilid against Pirimbingan's spirit guardian, Magolaing sa Ragat
Magolaing sa Ragat: a tonong of the enchantress Walain Pirimbangan; took the form of a gigantic crocodile
Sikag a Makaombaw: the intelligent and independent tonong (spirit) living within the Sikag a Makaombaw amulet, regarded as the most powerful amulet of all due to its ability to grant its wielder authority over all tonong
Salindagaw Masingir: a tonong of the hero Awilawil o Ndaw; acts as the guardian-spirit of the kingdom of Kaibat a Kadaan
Walain sa Lekepen: a goddess courted by the hero Bantogen
Diwata ko sa Magaw: spirit of destruction; a tolos or deity
Mino’aw a Minepen: powerful spirit of the sky; a tolos or deity
Naga: dragons who repel evil spirits; a specific huge Naga is said to encircle the world
Sarimanok: sacred omen birds
Arimaonga: a giant lion who causes lunar eclipses
Gabriel: an angel who reported to the supreme deity the overpopulation of the kingdom of Mantapoli, which resulted in its transfer and the creation of Lake Lanao
Malakal Maut: the angel of death; takes the souls of someone after three to seven days from the falling of the person's leaf from the sacred Sadiarathul Montaha tree in the realm called Sorga; appears either a handsome prince or a grotesque monsters, depending if the soul he is getting comed from a sinner or a virtuous person; punishes the souls of sinners until final judgment, while lifting up the souls of the good onto heaven
Tonong of Lake Lanao: there are many tonong of Lake Lanao, who are invoked during certain rituals such as the kashawing rice ritual
Taraka
Babowa
Mipesandalan of Masiu

Mortals

Aya Diwata Mokom sa Kaadiong a Lopa: father of the three rulers of the three kingdoms from the Darangen; a half-tonong and a half-human
Daromoyod an Olan: mother of the three rulers of the three kingdoms from the Darangen; a half-jinn and a half-human
Rulers of the Three Main Kingdoms from the Darangen: all three are siblings
Diwata Ndaw Gibon: a semi-divine hero who ruled the kingdom of Iliyan a Bembaran, which was a favord abode of the tonong; had two sons with his head-wife Aya Panganay Bai, and a total of five daughters from five other wives
Awilawil o Ndaw: a semi-divine hero who ruled the kingdom of Kaibat a Kadaan
Dalondong a Mimbantas: a semi-divine hero ruled the kingdom of Gindolongan Marogong, which possessed the enchanted river Pagayawan that refuses to flow without the presence of thunder
Aya Panganay Bai: married to Diwata Ndaw Gibon, who she has two sons; came from a place known as Minango’aw a Ronong
Tominaman sa Rogong: firstborn son of Diwata Ndaw Gibon and Aya Panganay Bai; succeeded his father as ruler of Iliyan a Bembaran
Magondaya’ Boisan: secondborn son Diwata Ndaw Gibon and Aya Panganay Bai; expanded the kingdom of Bembaran together with his brother-king, Tominaman sa Rogong
Pasandalan a Rogong: son of Tominaman sa Rogong
Bantogen: son of Tominaman sa Rogong; he courted the goddess Walain sa Lekepen, and was assumed missing by his people, leading to a search journey; returned with Madali to their kingdom
Ladalad a Madali: son of Magondaya’ Boisan; went into a journey to rescue his cousin Bantugen, and all those who first came to find Bantugen; can become invisible with the aided of his guardian spirits; aided by his grandfather's guardian spirit Pinatoli i Kilid who clashed with the Walain Pirimbangan's guardian spirit; shapeshifted into a woman to take the amulet of the goddess Walain Katolosan, foiling the plan of Pirimbangan
Walain Pirimbangan: an enchantress from Danalima’ a Rogong who imprisoned Bantugen and all the leaders of Bembaran who rescued him; aided by her guardian spirit, Magolaing sa Ragat
Maharadia Lawana: a man with eight heads who was banished for his bad mouth; tried to kill himself, but failed upon the intervention of the angel Gabriel
Kapmadali: a hero who battled Pinatola’ a Tonong
Pilandok: a cunning man who tricked various people from a blind man to a kingdom's ruler
Rajah Indarapatra: ancestor of both tonong and the Maranao; a child of heaven who chose to be reincarnated as a mortal son of the ruler Nabi Bakaramat; brother of Rajah Solaiman; before Rajah Solaiman went into a journey, Rajah Indarapatra planted a kilala sapling whose vitality is interpreted as Rajah Solaiman's life; when the plant died, Rajah Solaiman avenged his brother's death and slayed Omakaan without cutting the monster
Rajah Solaiman: went into a journey to slay Omakaan, but was killed by Omakaan
Laughing Woman: a woman who told Rajah Indarapatra what not to do to kill Omakaan
Omakaan: a man-eating monster who multiplies when cut into pieces
Kalalanagan: also called Princess Condor; all her previous husbands except Inodang died because she is the source of mosquitoes, which come from her nose
Inodang: the last husband of Kalalanagan; burned Kalalanagan to prevent more deaths, but some of Kalalanagan's mosquitoes escaped, which means Kalalanagan still lives
Turtle and Snake: friends who went into a race, where the patient turtle won
Lapindig: husband of Orak and Odang; upon finding his wives' death, he tightened his waist to stave off hunger and became the wasp
Orak: wife of Lapindig, killed herself after Odang's death
Odang: wife of Lapindig, accidentally died due to a quarrel with Orak about cooking and transporting food for Lapindig
Semsem sa Alongan: a magician; husband of Anak
Anak: wife of Semsem sa Alongan and youngest daughter of Sultan sa Agamaniyog; died due to a plan of Potre Bunso, where Anak was grounded by stone doors due to her failure to ask permission from Ring of Fire, Sharp and Pointed Metals, and Flowing River; her long hair became the leaves of the sapinit
Potre Bunso: jealous sister of Anak's good fortune
Tingting a Bulawan: sister of Anak

Sama-Bajau

Immortals

Dayang Dayang Mangilai: the goddess of the forest and one of the two supreme deities; married to Umboh Tuhan
Umboh Tuhan: also called Umboh Dilaut, the god of the sea and one of the two supreme deities; married to Dayang Dayang Mangilai; creator deity who made humans equal with animals and plants; also simply called as Tuhan
Umboh: a term sometimes used to encompass Umboh, Saitan, and Jinn spirits
Umboh: ancestral spirits
Saitan: nature spirits
Jinn: familiar spirits
Umboh Baliyu: spirits of wind and storms
Umboh Payi: also called Umboh Gandum, the spirits of the first rice harvest
Umboh Summut: totem of ants
Umboh Kamun: totem of mantis shrimp
Sumangâ: spirit of sea vessels; the guardian who deflects attacks
Bansa: ancestral ghosts
Kasagan: unseen spirits
Omboh Adam: later associated as the highest male spirit of dead ancestors due to Muslim influences; messenger of the supreme deity
Awa: later associated as the highest female spirit of dead ancestors dye to Muslim influences
Niyawa: spirits

Mortals

Abak: the king of a people who inhabited Balabac; led his people's migration to Capul island, where their descendants now reside

Footnotes

References 

 
 
 
 
 
 
 
 
 
 
 
 
 

Philippine mythology
Religion in the Philippines
Philippine